= Vuelta a Zamora =

Annual road cycling race

Race details
- Date: July
- Region: Province of Zamora, Spain
- English name: Tour of Zamora
- Discipline: Road
- Type: Stage race
- Organiser: Club Deportivo Escuela Ciclismo Zamora

History
- First edition: 1985
- Editions: 41 (as of 2024)
- First winner: Belmiro Silva (POR)
- Most wins: Ángel Vallejo (ESP); José Antonio de Segovia (ESP); (3 wins)
- Most recent: Maksym Bilyi (UKR)

The Vuelta a Zamora is a multi-day road cycling race held annually in the Province of Zamora, Castile and León, Spain. First held in 1985, it is one of the biggest amateur races in Spain.

== Winners ==
Year	Winner	Second	Third
1985	(Portugal) Belmiro Silva	(Spain) Laudelino Cubino	(Sweden) Björn Bäckmann
1986	(Spain) José Carlos Pliego	(Spain) Alejandro Vázquez	(Spain) Fabián García
1987	(Spain) José Antonio Sánchez	(Spain) Federico García Melia	(Spain) Juan Carlos Arribas
1988	(Spain) Pedro Merayo	(Spain) Luis Miguel Guerra	(Spain) José Luis Díaz
1989	(Spain) Rafael López	(Spain) Pedro Luis García	(Spain) Miguel A. Colmenero
1990	(Spain) Antonio Sánchez García	(Spain) José A. Mereciano	(Spain) Carlos A. Torres
1991	(Spain) Ignacio Duque	(Spain) Antonio Martín Velasco	(Spain) Iñigo González de Heredia
1992	(Spain) José Manuel García García	(Spain) Julio Coello	(Spain) Javier Pascual Llorente
1993	(Spain) José A. Ruiz	(Spain) Gabriel Martínez	(Spain) Juan Manuel Toribio
1994	(Denmark) Claus Michael Møller	(Spain) Juan C. Martín	(Spain) Jon Carbayeda
1995	(Spain) Mikel Pradera	(Spain) Miguel Ángel Manteiga	(Spain) Juan C. Estrada
1996	non disputé		
1997	(Spain) Mario Herráez	(Spain) David Martínez	(Spain) Óscar Movilla
1998	(Spain) César García Calvo	(Spain) Alberto David Fernández Hurtado	(Spain) Mario Herráez
1999	(Spain) Iban Mayo	(Spain) Alexis Rodríguez	(Spain) Miguel Ángel Manteiga
2000	(Spain) Patxi Vila	(Spain) Sergio Pérez	(Spain) Alexis Rodríguez
2001	(Spain) Juan Manuel Fuentes	(Spain) Pedro Arreitunandia	(Spain) Gerardo García
2002	(Spain) Francisco Palacios	(Mexico) Juan Pablo Magallanes	(Russia) Oleg Radinov
2003	(Costa Rica) José Adrián Bonilla	(Spain) Alberto Martín	(Spain) Moisés Dueñas
2004	(Mexico) Ignacio Sarabia	(Spain) Víctor Gómez	(Russia) Alexei Bougrov
2005	(Spain) Javier Sáez	(Spain) Juan José Abril	(Spain) Sergio Bernardo
2006	(Spain) Manuel Jiménez Ruiz	(Spain) David Gutiérrez Gutiérrez	(Costa Rica) Marconi Durán
2007	(Spain) David Gutiérrez Gutiérrez	(Spain) Miguel Ángel Candil	(Spain) Juan Carlos Escámez
2008	(Spain) David Belda	(Spain) José de Segovia	(Spain) Raúl García de Mateos
2009	(Spain) Raúl Castaño	(Spain) Rafael Rodríguez Segarra	(Spain) Gustavo Rodriguez
2010	(Spain) Ángel Vallejo	(Spain) Raúl García de Mateos	(Spain) Moisés Dueñas
2011	(Spain) Antonio Olmo	(Spain) Israel Pérez	(Spain) Raúl García de Mateos
2012	(Spain) Moisés Dueñas	(Spain) Arkaitz Durán	(Spain) Miguel Ángel Benito
2013	(Spain) Ángel Vallejo	(Ukraine) Oleh Chuzhda	(Spain) Víctor Martín
2014	(Spain) José de Segovia	(Spain) Martín Lestido	(Spain) Imanol Estévez
2015	(Spain) Iván Martínez	(Spain) Miguel Gómez	(Spain) Sergio Rodríguez Reche
2016	(Spain) Manuel Sola	(Chile) Wolfgang Burmann	(Spain) Sergio Rodríguez Reche
2017	(Uruguay) Mauricio Moreira	(Spain) Antonio Gómez de la Torre	(Australia) Freddy Ovett
2018	(Spain) Eusebio Pascual	(Spain) Pablo Guerrero	(Spain) Diego Noriega
2019	(Spain) Iván Moreno	(Spain) Alejandro Ropero	(Spain) Martí Márquez
2020	(Spain) Josu Etxeberria	(Spain) Samuel Blanco	(Spain) Raúl García Pierna
2021	(Spain) Eugenio Sánchez	(Spain) Eduardo Pérez-Landaluce	(Spain) Víctor Etxeberria
2022	(Uruguay) Eric Fagúndez	(Ethiopia) Mulu Hailemichael	(Spain) Javier Serrano
2023	(Guatemala) Sergio Chumil	(Spain) David Delgado Higueruelo	(Spain) Álvaro Sagrado Perez
2024	(Ukraine) Maksym Bilyi	(United States) Kade Kreikemeier	(United States) Kellen Caldwell
