= Krzysztof Włodarczyk =

Polish boxer (born 1981)

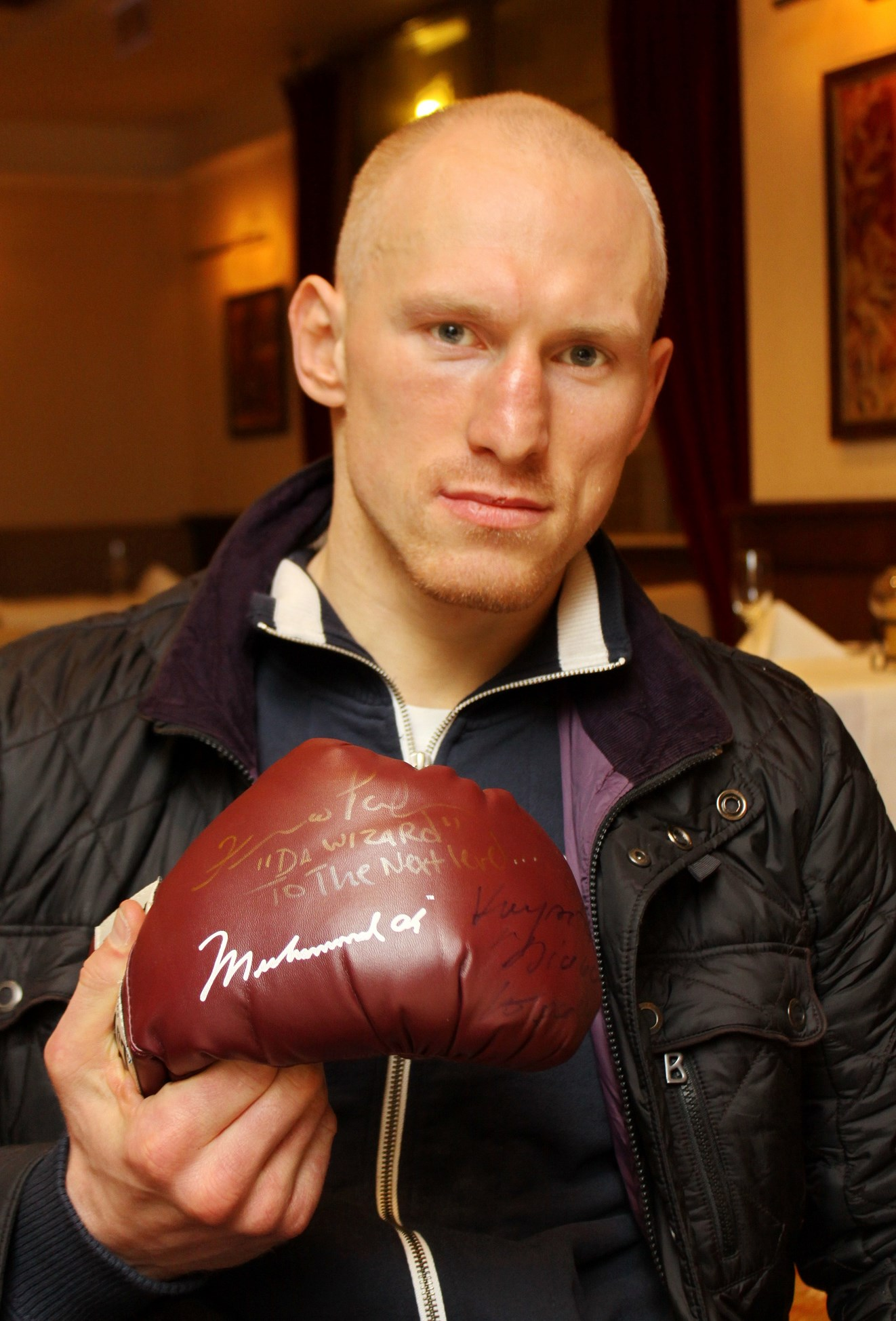
- Włodarczyk in 2011

Personal information
- Nickname: Diablo ("Devil")
- Nationality: Polish
- Born: 19 September 1981 (age 45) Warsaw, Polish People's Republic
- Height: 1.86 m (6 ft 1 in)
- Weight: Cruiserweight; Bridgerweight

Boxing career
- Reach: 191 cm (75 in)
- Stance: Orthodox

Boxing record
- Total fights: 71
- Wins: 66
- Win by KO: 45
- Losses: 4
- Draws: 1

Krzysztof Włodarczyk (Polish pronunciation: [ˈkʂɨʂtɔv vwɔˈdart͡ʂɨk]; born 19 September 1981) is a Polish professional boxer. He is a two-time world champion in the cruiserweight division, having held the International Boxing Federation (IBF) title from 2006 to 2007, and World Boxing Council (WBC) title from 2010 to 2014. He also held WBC interim bridgerweight title from 2025 to 2026.

== Professional career ==
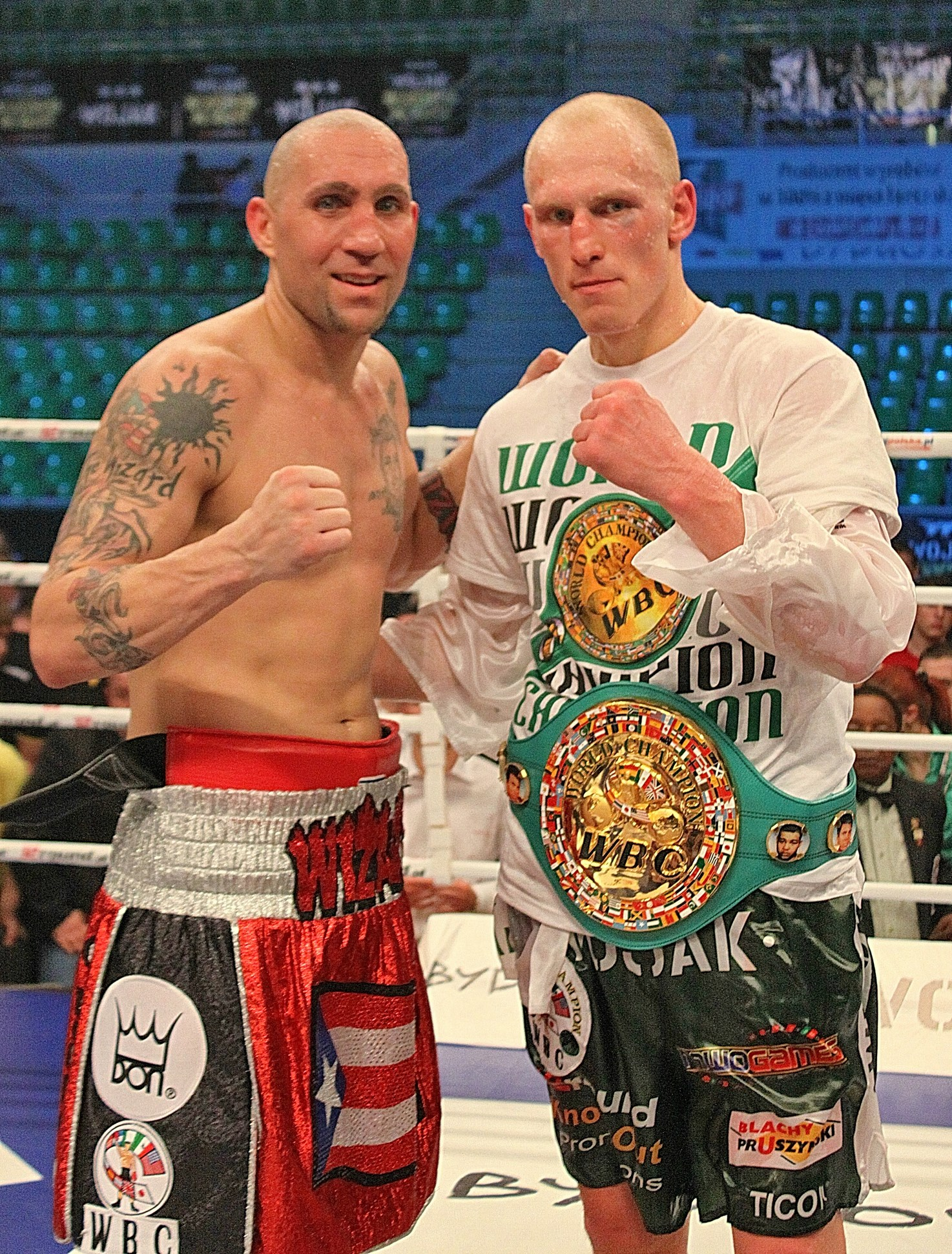
Włodarczyk and Francisco Palacios after their fight in 2011. Włodarczyk is posing with the WBC title.

Włodarczyk held the IBF Inter-Continental cruiserweight title during 2001–2002, the Polish International cruiserweight title during 2002–2004, the WBC Youth cruiserweight title during 2003–2004, the World Boxing Foundation cruiserweight title in 2004, the European Union cruiserweight title in 2005, the International Boxing Council cruiserweight title during 2006–2007, the WBC FECARBOX cruiserweight title in 2006 and the IBF cruiserweight title during 2006–2007.

His trainer is Fiodor Lapin.

He won the IBF title on November 25, 2006 with a split decision over Steve Cunningham (19–0, 11 KOs) but lost in a rematch on May 26, 2007.

He fought Giacobbe Fragomeni (26–1, 10 KOs) on May 16, 2009 for the WBC cruiserweight title. Włodarczyk knocked down his opponent during round 9 but the fight went to a draw, in May 2010 he won a heated rematch by TKO in round 8 at the Atlas Arena in Łódź, Poland.

In September 2010, Włodarczyk defended his title against unsung Jason Robinson. In November 2011, he successfully defended his title against Australian Danny Green (31–4, 27 KOs) by TKO in the eleventh round at Challenge Stadium in Western Australia. He also beat undefeated Puerto Rican Francisco Palacios by SD in 2011 and by UD in 2012.

In 2013 he upset undefeated Russian Olympic champion Rakhim Chakhkiev (16–0, 12 KOs) after coming off the deck to win by KO in Moscow for his arguably biggest win. On December 6, 2013 Wlodarczyk made his 6th successful title defence when he fought Giacobbe Fragomeni a third time at UIC Pavilion in Chicago. The fight was stopped after round 6 in favour of Wlodarczyk, due to a cut over Fragomeni's left eye.

Wlodarczyk lost his WBC cruiserweight title on September 27, 2014 to Grigory Drozd (38–1, 27 KOs). At the Krylatskoe Sport Palace in Moscow, the judges scored the bout 118–109, 119–108, 119–108 all in favour of Drozd.

On 20 May 2017, he fought undefeated contender Noel Gevor. In a rough, close fight, Wlodarczyk managed to outperform Gevor in the final rounds in order to snatch a split-decision win.

On 21 October 2017 Wlodarczyk challenged IBF champion Murat Gassiev (24–0, 18 KOs) in the World Boxing Super Series quarter-final bout at the Prudential Center in Newark, New Jersey. Gassiev delivered a 3rd round KO, connecting with a left to the body, dropping Wlodarczyk.

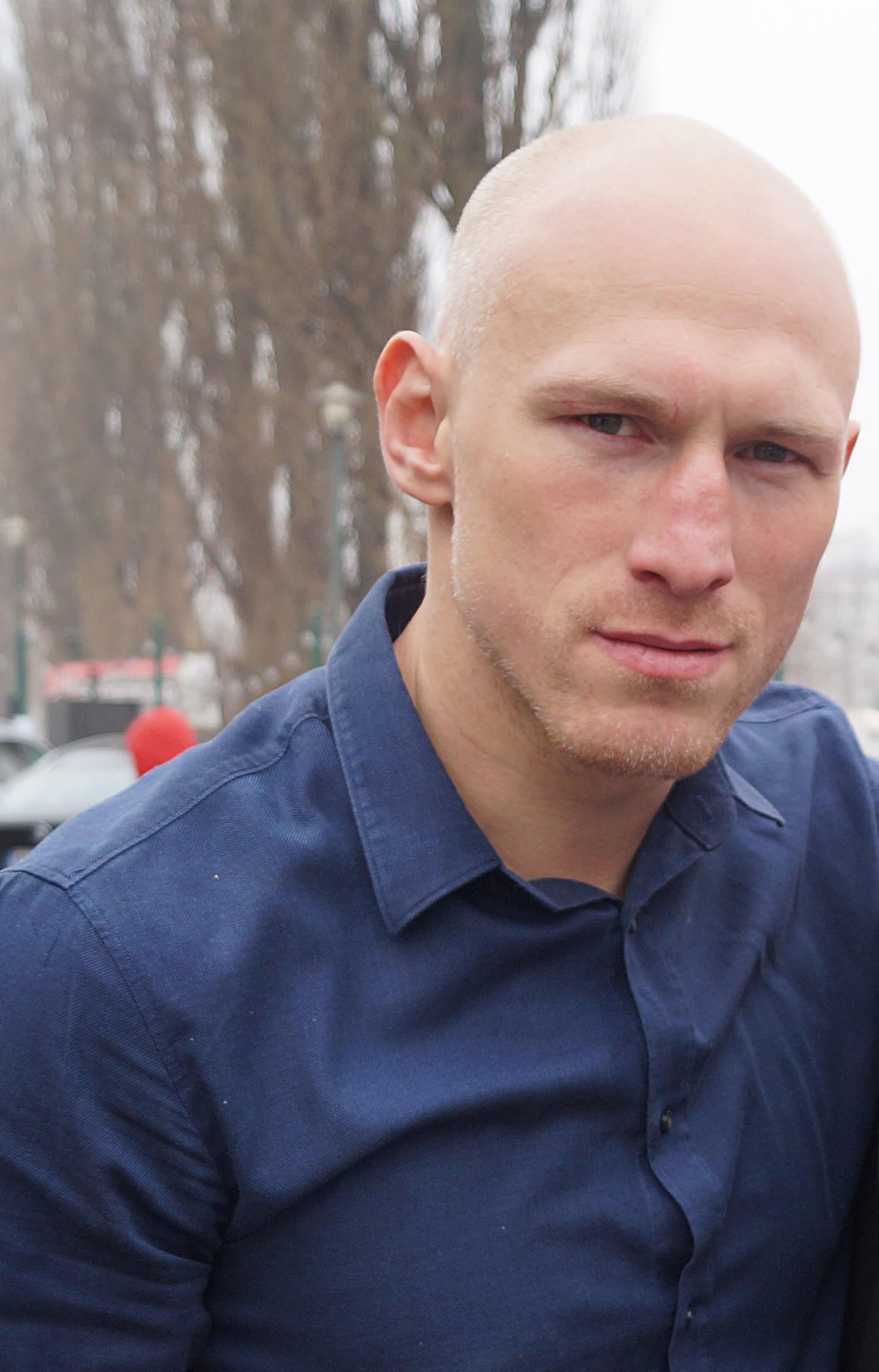
Włodarczyk in 2017

Wlodarczyk notched his 55th career win on 2 June 2018 at the G2A Arena in Rzeszow, when he outboxed Nigeria’s Olanrewaju Durodola (27–5, 25 KOs) to a unanimous decision. The judges scored the fight 97–93, 97–93 and 98–92 on the third card. It was Wlodarczyk’s second victory following his first ever stoppage defeat.

On November 6, 2021 Krzysztof Wlodarczyk registered his 60th victory as Argentinian Maximiliano Gomez (29–5, 13 KOs) bowed out after four rounds.

On October 7, 2023 Wlodarczyk faced professional mixed martial artist (28–17), former UFC fighter, and boxer (29–7, 28 KOs), Fabio Maldonado. The bout – held at the Hala MOSiR, Jastrzębie-Zdrój – was stopped by referee Tomasz Chwoszcz in the seventh round, with a Wlodarczyk TKO win.

On May 25, 2025 Wlodarczyk faced fellow countryman (20–2), Adam Balski for the WBC interim Bridgerweight title. The bout was stopped by referee Daniel Van de Wiele in the tenth round, where Wlodarczyk won via KO, and thus winning his first title in nine years.

== Professional boxing record ==
71 fights	66 wins	4 losses
By knockout	45	1
By decision	21	3
Draws	1	

No.	Result	Record	Opponent	Type	Round, time	Date	Location	Notes
71	Win	66–4–1	Adam Balski	KO	10 (12), 2:35	25 May 2025	Arena Kalisz, Kalisz, Poland	Won vacant WBC interim bridgerweight title
70	Win	65–4–1	Pablo Cesar Villanueva	UD	8	24 Feb 2024	Opera i Filharmonia Podlaska, Białystok, Poland	
69	Win	64–4–1	Edwin Mosquera	KO	1 (8), 1:24	4 Nov 2023	Nosalowy Dwór, Zakopane, Poland	
68	Win	63–4–1	Fabio Maldonado	KO	7 (8), 2:50	7 Oct 2023	Hala MOSiR, Jastrzębie-Zdrój, Poland	
67	Win	62–4–1	Sylvera Louis	KO	7 (8), 0:51	5 May 2023	Opera i Filharmonia Podlaska, Białystok, Poland	
66	Win	61–4–1	Cesar Hernan Reynoso	TKO	6 (8), 1:40	29 Sep 2022	Nosalowy Dwór Hotel Zakopane, Poland	
65	Win	60–4–1	Maximiliano Jorge Gomez	TKO	4 (8), 3:00	6 Nov 2021	Hala Sportowa, Nowy Sącz, Poland	
64	Win	59–4–1	Vadym Novopashyn	UD	8	17 Jul 2021	Suwałki Arena, Suwałki, Poland	
63	Win	58–4–1	Taylor Mabika	UD	10	30 Nov 2019	Nosalowy Dwór Hotel, Zakopane, Poland	
62	Win	57–4–1	Alexandru Jur	UD	10	23 Mar 2019	Hala Sportowa, Łomża, Poland	
61	Win	56–4–1	Al Sands	KO	2 (10), 1:19	6 Oct 2018	Nosalowy Dwór Hotel, Zakopane, Poland	
60	Win	55–4–1	Olanrewaju Durodola	UD	10	2 Jun 2018	G2A Arena, Rzeszów, Poland	
59	Win	54–4–1	Adam Gadajew	RTD	2 (8), 3:00	10 Feb 2018	Nysa Hall, Nysa, Poland	
58	Loss	53–4–1	Murat Gassiev	KO	3 (12), 1:57	21 Oct 2017	Prudential Center, Newark, New Jersey, US	For IBF cruiserweight title; World Boxing Super Series: cruiserweight quarter-final
57	Win	53–3–1	Noel Gevor	SD	12	20 May 2017	HWS Arena, Poznań, Poland	
56	Win	52–3–1	Leon Harth	UD	12	10 Dec 2016	Hala Orbita, Wrocław, Poland	Retained IBF Inter-Continental cruiserweight title
55	Win	51–3–1	Kai Kurzawa	TKO	4 (12), 2:22	28 May 2016	Arena Szczecin, Szczecin, Poland	Won vacant IBF Inter-Continental cruiserweight title
54	Win	50–3–1	Valery Brudov	TKO	2 (8), 1:58	4 Mar 2016	MOSiR Hall, Sosnowiec, Poland	
53	Loss	49–3–1	Grigory Drozd	UD	12	27 Sep 2014	Krylatskoe Sport Palace, Moscow, Russia	Lost WBC cruiserweight title
52	Win	49–2–1	Giacobbe Fragomeni	RTD	6 (12), 3:00	6 Dec 2013	UIC Pavilion, Chicago, Illinois, US	Retained WBC cruiserweight title
51	Win	48–2–1	Rakhim Chakhkiev	TKO	8 (12), 2:03	21 Jun 2013	Krylatskoe Sport Palace, Moscow, Russia	Retained WBC cruiserweight title
50	Win	47–2–1	Francisco Palacios	UD	12	22 Sep 2012	Hala Stulecia, Wrocław, Poland	Retained WBC cruiserweight title
49	Win	46–2–1	Danny Green	TKO	11 (12), 2:15	30 Nov 2011	Challenge Stadium, Mount Claremont, Australia	Retained WBC cruiserweight title
48	Win	45–2–1	Francisco Palacios	SD	12	2 Apr 2011	Łuczniczka, Bydgoszcz, Poland	Retained WBC cruiserweight title
47	Win	44–2–1	Jason Robinson	UD	12	25 Sep 2010	Torwar Hall, Warsaw, Poland	Retained WBC cruiserweight title
46	Win	43–2–1	Giacobbe Fragomeni	TKO	8 (12), 0:44	15 May 2010	Atlas Arena, Łódź, Poland	Won vacant WBC cruiserweight title
45	Win	42–2–1	Konstantin Semerdjiev	UD	8	27 Nov 2009	Hala MOSiR, Ełk, Poland	
44	Draw	41–2–1	Giacobbe Fragomeni	SD	12	16 May 2009	Il Gran Teatro, Rome, Italy	For WBC cruiserweight title
43	Win	41–2	Gabor Gyuris	KO	1 (8), 1:56	5 Apr 2008	CeSiR, Warka, Poland	
42	Win	40–2	Gabor Halasz	TKO	4 (10), 1:30	9 Feb 2008	Hala Sportowo-Widowiskowa "Globus", Lublin, Poland	
41	Win	39–2	Moyoyo Mensah	TKO	5 (10), 1:42	15 Dec 2007	Hala Podpromie, Rzeszów, Poland	
40	Win	38–2	Dominique Alexander	KO	1 (12), 2:13	20 Oct 2007	International Expo Center, Warsaw, Poland	Won vacant IBC cruiserweight title
39	Loss	37–2	Steve Cunningham	MD	12	26 May 2007	Spodek, Katowice, Poland	Lost IBF cruiserweight title
38	Win	37–1	Steve Cunningham	SD	12	25 Nov 2006	Torwar Hall, Warsaw, Poland	Won vacant IBF cruiserweight title
37	Win	36–1	Mircea Telecan	TKO	1 (8), 2:25	1 Jul 2006	KOSiR, Kepno, Poland	
36	Win	35–1	Imamu Mayfield	UD	12	25 Mar 2006	Sports Hall, Siedlce, Poland	Won vacant WBC FECARBOX and IBC cruiserweight titles
35	Win	34–1	Sebastian Hill	UD	6	26 Nov 2005	Copernicus Center, Chicago, Illinois, US	
34	Win	33–1	Héctor Alfredo Ávila	KO	6 (10), 2:06	24 Sep 2005	Katowice, Poland	
33	Win	32–1	John Keeton	TKO	4 (10)	11 Jun 2005	Gorzów Wielkopolski, Poland	Retained WBC Youth cruiserweight title
32	Win	31–1	Rüdiger May	KO	10 (10), 1:30	16 Apr 2005	Bydgoszcz, Poland	Won vacant European Union cruiserweight title
31	Win	30–1	Tefouet Dieudonne	KO	8 (12)	19 Feb 2005	OSiR, Wolów, Poland	
30	Win	29–1	Bryan Blakely	TKO	3 (6), 1:38	21 Jan 2005	Belvedere Events & Banquets, Elk Grove Village, Illinois, US	
29	Win	28–1	Bruce Oezbek	TKO	7 (8)	19 Dec 2004	Rzeszów, Poland	
28	Win	27–1	Joseph Marwa	UD	10	25 Sep 2004	Opole, Poland	Retained WBC Youth cruiserweight title
27	Win	26–1	Alain Simon	TKO	6 (12)	5 Jun 2004	Dąbrowa Górnicza, Poland	Won vacant WBF (Foundation) cruiserweight title
26	Win	25–1	Stefan Stanko	TKO	2 (6)	24 Apr 2004	Dąbrowa Górnicza, Poland	
25	Win	24–1	Raymond Ochieng	TKO	1 (10), 0:35	27 Mar 2004	MOSiR Hall, Radom, Poland	Retained Polish International cruiserweight title
24	Win	23–1	Siarhei Karanevich	SD	10	13 Dec 2003	Hala Okrąglak, Opole, Poland	Won vacant WBC Youth cruiserweight title
23	Win	22–1	Attila Huszka	TKO	1	24 Oct 2003	Hala Orbita, Wrocław, Poland	
22	Win	21–1	Roberto Coelho	UD	10	28 Jun 2003	Opole, Poland	Retained Polish International cruiserweight title
21	Loss	20–1	Pavel Melkomyan	TD	4 (12), 3:00	26 Apr 2003	Sport- und Kongresshalle, Schwerin, Germany	For vacant WBA Inter-Continental cruiserweight title; Unanimous TD: Melkomian cut
20	Win	20–0	Goodman Kwinana	KO	5 (8)	15 Feb 2003	MOSiR Hall, Zabrze, Poland	
19	Win	19–0	Ismail Abdoul	TKO	12 (12)	23 Nov 2002	Opole, Poland	Retained IBF Inter-Continental cruiserweight title
18	Win	18–0	Marian Geroseanu	KO	1 (6)	18 Oct 2002	Kozienice, Poland	
17	Win	17–0	Siarhei Krupenich	TKO	5 (10)	21 Sep 2002	Stargard, Poland	Won vacant Polish International cruiserweight title
16	Win	16–0	Zoltan Komlosi	PTS	6	22 Jun 2002	Płock, Poland	
15	Win	15–0	Badara M'baye	KO	6 (12)	4 May 2002	Hala Ludowa, Wrocław, Poland	Retained IBF Inter-Continental cruiserweight title
14	Win	14–0	Rodney Phillips	KO	2 (6)	6 Apr 2002	Łódź, Poland	
13	Win	13–0	Otto Nemeth	TKO	1 (6)	23 Feb 2002	OSiR, Włocławek, Poland	
12	Win	12–0	Vincenzo Rossitto	TKO	10 (12)	7 Dec 2001	Quartucciu, Italy	Won vacant IBF Inter-Continental cruiserweight title
11	Win	11–0	Vladislav Druso	UD	8	27 Oct 2001	Warsaw, Poland	
10	Win	10–0	Gyorgy Orsola	TKO	2	29 Sep 2001	Poznań, Poland	
9	Win	9–0	Attila Szombathelyi	KO	3	30 Jun 2001	Tarnów, Poland	
8	Win	8–0	Rene Janvier	UD	8	26 May 2001	Warsaw, Poland	
7	Win	7–0	Radoslav Milutinovic	PTS	6	28 Apr 2001	Jaworzno, Poland	
6	Win	6–0	Dusan Pasic	TKO	2	31 Mar 2001	Środa Wielkopolska, Poland	
5	Win	5–0	Roman Kaloczai	TKO	4	24 Feb 2001	Nowy Sącz, Poland	
4	Win	4–0	Roman Nikodem	TKO	3	3 Feb 2001	Warsaw, Poland	
3	Win	3–0	Robert Bycek	KO	1	9 Dec 2000	Katowice, Poland	
2	Win	2–0	Anton Lascek	TKO	2	2 Sep 2000	Chorzów, Poland	
1	Win	1–0	Andrei Georgiev	KO	2	10 Jun 2000	Elbląg, Poland	

== Exhibition boxing record ==
1 fight	0 wins	0 losses
By knockout	0	0
By decision	0	0
Draws	1	

No.	Result	Record	Opponent	Type	Round, time	Date	Location	Notes
1	Draw	0–0–1	Adrian Błeszyński	UD	3	24 Sep 2024	Amfiteatr w Ustroniu, Ustroń, Poland	

Sporting positions
Regional boxing titles
Vacant Title last held by Alexander Gurov	IBF Inter-Continental cruiserweight champion 7 December 2001 – February 2003; Vacated	Vacant Title next held by Vadim Tokarev
New title	Poland International cruiserweight champion 21 September 2002 – July 2006; Vacated	Vacant Title next held by Wojciech Bartnik
Vacant Title last held by Firat Arslan	WBC Youth cruiserweight champion 16 April 2005 – March 2006; Vacated	Vacant Title next held by Ismail Abdoul
Vacant Title last held by Eliecer Castillo	WBC FECARBOX cruiserweight champion 25 March 2006 – November 2006; Vacated	Vacant Title next held by Santander Silgado
Vacant Title last held by Mairis Briedis	IBF Inter-Continental cruiserweight champion 28 May 2016 – September 2017; Vacated	Vacant Title next held by Bilal Laggoune
Minor world boxing titles
New title	WBF (Foundation) cruiserweight champion 4 June 2004 – March 2006; Vacated	Vacant Title next held by Gyorgy Hidvegi
Vacant Title last held by Virgil Hill	IBC cruiserweight champion 25 March 2006 – July 2006; Vacated	Vacant Title next held by Himself
Vacant Title last held by Himself	IBC cruiserweight champion 20 October 2007 – May 2009; Vacated	Vacant Title next held by Paweł Kołodziej
Major world boxing titles
Vacant Title last held by O'Neil Bell	IBF cruiserweight champion 11 November 2006 – 5 May 2007	Succeeded by Steve Cunningham
Vacant Title last held by Zsolt Erdei	WBC cruiserweight champion 15 May 2010 – 27 September 2014	Succeeded by Grigory Drozd
