= Referee (boxing) =

Individual enforcing rules in a boxing match

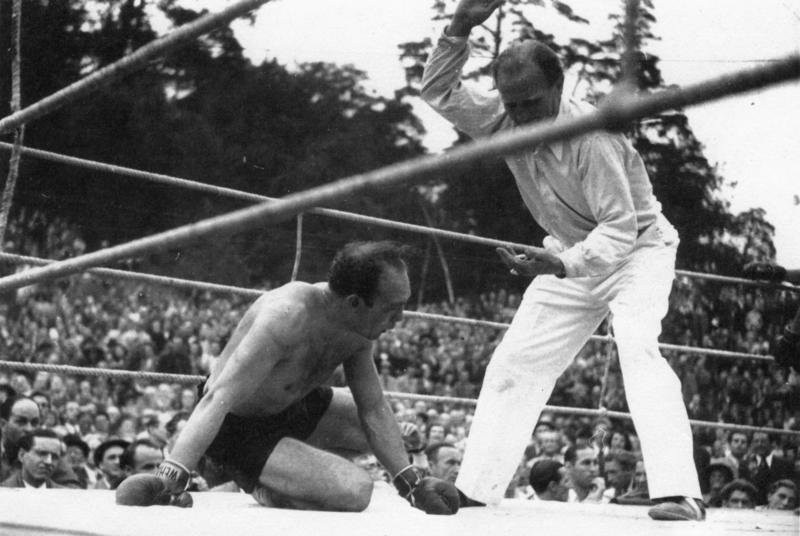
A boxing referee counting a boxer

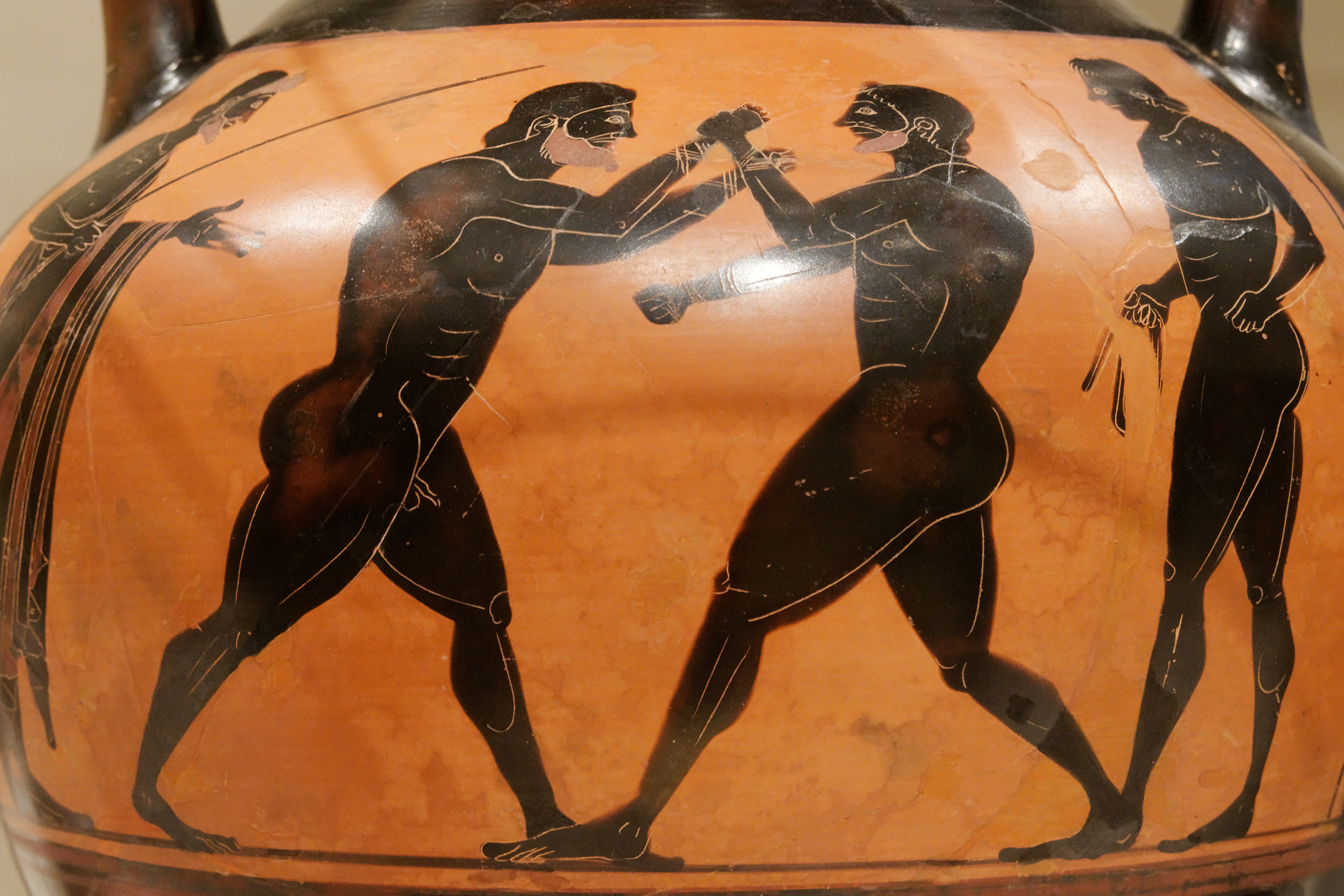
An ancient boxing match, supervised by the referee (left)

The referee in boxing is the individual charged with enforcing the rules of that sport during a match.

== The role of the referee ==
The referee has the following roles:

- Gives instructions to both boxers before the fight
- Determines when to start or stop a count when a fighter is down
- Determines when a foul is so egregious that a warning should be given or points taken away
- Signals when the round is over
- Determines when one fighter's health will be endangered by more blows, and thus, stops the fight.

In the past, referees were involved in judging the fight. However, that role has been progressively replaced by a panel of judges, except for domestic fights in some countries.

== Attire ==
Normally, a white or blue Oxford shirt is worn either long-sleeved or short-sleeved, as well as black slacks, black leather shoes and a black bow tie. Latex gloves are sometimes worn for sanitary reasons. For professional matches a patch is usually worn on the left breast bearing the insignia of the organization sanctioning the fight. The referee may also wear a patch on his left sleeve bearing the flag of his home country. This is especially common in matches between fighters from two countries.

== Criticisms ==
The main critique involves the subjective nature of boxing refereeing; there are guidelines for referees, but enforcement of the rules still involves judgement.

== Notable referees ==
- Stanley Christodoulou
- Joe Cortez
- Kenny Bayless
- Daniel Van de Wiele
- Ruby Goldstein
- Mills Lane
- Arthur Mercante Sr.
- Arthur Mercante Jr.
- Jay Nady
- Randy Neumann
- Richard Steele
- Mickey Vann
- Pete Podgorski
- Joey Curtis
- Octavio Meyran
- Eddie Cotton
- Charles Eyton
- Frank Cappuccino
- Steve Smoger
- Jon D. Schorle II
- Tony Perez
