= Eugenio Sánchez =

Eugenio Sánchez may refer to:

- Junior Sanchez (Eugenio Sanchez Jr.), American record producer
- Eugenio Sánchez (cyclist), Spanish cyclist
