= Mathieu Burgaudeau =

French cyclist (born 1998)

- Burgaudeau in 2026

Personal information
- Born: 17 November 1998 (age 27) Noirmoutier-en-l'Île, France
- Height: 1.65 m (5 ft 5 in)
- Weight: 62 kg (137 lb)

Cycling career
- Sport: Cycling
- Current team: Team TotalEnergies
- Discipline: Road
- Role: Rider

Amateur teams
- 2015–2016: Saint-Jean de Monts Vendée Cyclisme
- 2017–2018: Vendée U

Professional teams
- 2017: Direct Énergie (stagiaire)
- 2019–: Direct Énergie

Mathieu Burgaudeau (born 17 November 1998 in Noirmoutier-en-l'Île) is a French cyclist, who currently rides for UCI ProTeam Team TotalEnergies. Professional since 2019, he has competed in four editions of the Tour de France, notably finishing second on stage 12 of the 2023 edition. He has also won a stage of the 2022 Paris–Nice and finished second in the 2023 Bretagne Classic.

== Major results ==
2015
1st Mountains classification, Tour du Pays de Vaud
2016
4th Kuurne–Brussels–Kuurne Juniors
7th Overall Tour du Valromey

1st Stages 1 & 4

7th Overall Aubel–Thimister–La Gleize

1st Points classification

8th Chrono des Nations Juniors
2017
3rd Overall Tour de Gironde

1st Young rider classification

2018
3rd Ghent–Wevelgem U23
10th Overall Le Triptyque des Monts et Châteaux
2019
9th Road race, UCI Road World Under-23 Championships
2021
3rd Coppa Sabatini
3rd Boucles de l'Aulne
7th Classic Loire Atlantique
8th Paris-Troyes
8th Memorial Marco Pantani
2022 (1 pro win)
1st Stage 6 Paris–Nice
2nd Tour du Doubs
5th Overall Étoile de Bessèges
10th La Drôme Classic
2023
2nd Bretagne Classic
6th Grand Prix du Morbihan
10th Coppa Sabatini
2024 (4)
1st Overall Tour of Istanbul

1st Stages 2 & 3

4th Overall Tour du Limousin

1st Stage 4

6th Coppa Agostoni
2025
Combativity award Stage 8 Tour de France
2026
8th Circuito de Getxo

=== Grand Tour general classification results timeline ===
Grand Tour	2020	2021	2022	2023	2024
Giro d'Italia	—	—	—	—	—
Tour de France	131	—	68	31	63
Vuelta a España	—	—	—	—	—

Legend
—	Did not compete
DNF	Did not finish
