= 2017 Tour de Romandie =

Cycling race

2017 UCI World Tour, race 19 of 37

Race details
- Dates: 25–30 April 2017
- Stages: 6
- Distance: 682.98 km (424.38 mi)
- Winning time: 17h 16' 00"

Results
Jersey awarded to the overall winner	Winner	Richie Porte (AUS)	(BMC Racing Team)
	Second	Simon Yates (GBR)	(Orica–Scott)
	Third	Primož Roglič (SLO)	(LottoNL–Jumbo)
Jersey awarded to the points classification winner	Points	Stefan Küng (SUI)	(BMC Racing Team)
Jersey awarded to the mountains classification winner	Mountains	Sander Armée (BEL)	(Lotto–Soudal)
Jersey awarded to the young rider classification winner	Young rider	Pierre Latour (FRA)	(AG2R La Mondiale)
	Team	Movistar Team	

The 2017 Tour de Romandie was a road cycling stage race that took place between 25 and 30 April in Romandy, Switzerland. It was the 71st edition of the Tour de Romandie and the nineteenth event of the 2017 UCI World Tour.

The race was won on the final day by Australia's Richie Porte (BMC Racing Team), who overhauled a 19-second deficit to British rider Simon Yates over the 17.88-kilometre (11.11 mi) time trial, and won the race for the first time. Yates – riding for the Orica–Scott squad – was able to finish second overall, holding off LottoNL–Jumbo's Primož Roglič of Slovenia, who won the final time trial and finished just five seconds in arrears of Yates at the finish. In the race's other classifications, Belgian Sander Armée won the mountains classification for the second year in succession for Lotto–Soudal, home rider Stefan Küng won the points classification for the BMC Racing Team, while 14th place overall was enough for Pierre Latour (AG2R La Mondiale) to win the young rider classification. The teams classification was won by the Movistar Team.

== Participating teams ==
As the Tour de Romandie was a UCI World Tour event, all eighteen UCI WorldTeams were invited automatically and were obliged to enter a team in the race. The only non-WorldTeam in the race were Wanty–Groupe Gobert.

UCI WorldTeams

- AG2R La Mondiale
- Astana
- Bahrain–Merida
- BMC Racing Team
- Bora–Hansgrohe
- Cannondale–Drapac
- Team Dimension Data
- FDJ
- Team Katusha–Alpecin
- LottoNL–Jumbo
- Lotto–Soudal
- Movistar Team
- Orica–Scott
- Quick-Step Floors
- Team Sky
- Team Sunweb
- Trek–Segafredo
- UAE Team Emirates

UCI Professional Continental teams

- Wanty–Groupe Gobert

== Route ==
The race itinerary was announced on 10 December 2016. The second stage, initially scheduled to be run over 160.7 km (100 mi), and to start in Champéry, was shortened due to snow.

Stage schedule
Stage	Date	Route	Distance	Type	Winner
P	25 April	Aigle	4.8 km (3.0 mi)	Prologue	Fabio Felline (ITA)
1	26 April	Aigle to Champéry	173.3 km (107.7 mi)	Hilly stage	Michael Albasini (SUI)
2	27 April	Aigle to Bulle	136.5 km (84.8 mi) (Note: Stage reduced from 160.7 km (100 mi) due to snow.)	Mountain stage	Stefan Küng (SUI)
3	28 April	Payerne to Payerne	187 km (116.2 mi)	Flat stage	Elia Viviani (ITA)
4	29 April	Domdidier to Leysin	163.5 km (101.6 mi)	Mountain stage	Simon Yates (GBR)
5	30 April	Lausanne to Lausanne	17.88 km (11.1 mi)	Individual time trial	Primož Roglič (SLO)

== Stages ==
=== Prologue ===
25 April 2017 — Aigle, 4.8 kilometres (3.0 mi), individual time trial (ITT)

Prologue Result and General Classification after Prologue
Rank	Rider	Team	Time
1	Fabio Felline (ITA)	Trek–Segafredo	5' 57"
2	Alex Dowsett (GBR)	Movistar Team	+ 2"
3	Alex Edmondson (AUS)	Orica–Scott	+ 7"
4	Maximilian Schachmann (GER)	Quick-Step Floors	+ 8"
5	Victor Campenaerts (BEL)	LottoNL–Jumbo	+ 8"
6	Primož Roglič (SLO)	LottoNL–Jumbo	+ 9"
7	Vasil Kiryienka (BLR)	Team Sky	+ 10"
8	Tom Bohli (SUI)	BMC Racing Team	+ 10"
9	Johan Le Bon (FRA)	FDJ	+ 11"
10	Christoph Pfingsten (GER)	Bora–Hansgrohe	+ 11"

=== Stage 1 ===
26 April 2017 — Aigle to Champéry, 173.3 kilometres (107.7 mi)

Stage 1 result
Rank	Rider	Team	Time
1	Michael Albasini (SUI)	Orica–Scott	4h 33' 10"
2	Diego Ulissi (ITA)	UAE Team Emirates	+ 0"
3	Jesús Herrada (ESP)	Movistar Team	+ 0"
4	Natnael Berhane (ERI)	Team Dimension Data	+ 0"
5	Chris Froome (GBR)	Team Sky	+ 0"
6	Pello Bilbao (ESP)	Astana	+ 0"
7	Wilco Kelderman (NED)	Team Sunweb	+ 0"
8	David de la Cruz (ESP)	Quick-Step Floors	+ 0"
9	Richard Carapaz (ECU)	Movistar Team	+ 0"
10	Pierre Latour (FRA)	AG2R La Mondiale	+ 0"

General classification after stage 1
Rank	Rider	Team	Time
1	Fabio Felline (ITA)	Trek–Segafredo	4h 39' 07"
2	Maximilian Schachmann (GER)	Quick-Step Floors	+ 8"
3	Jesús Herrada (ESP)	Movistar Team	+ 8"
4	Primož Roglič (SLO)	LottoNL–Jumbo	+ 9"
5	Ion Izagirre (ESP)	Bahrain–Merida	+ 12"
6	Bob Jungels (LUX)	Quick-Step Floors	+ 12"
7	José Gonçalves (POR)	Team Katusha–Alpecin	+ 13"
8	Rubén Fernández (ESP)	Movistar Team	+ 13"
9	Michael Albasini (SUI)	Orica–Scott	+ 14"
10	Jonathan Castroviejo (ESP)	Movistar Team	+ 14"

=== Stage 2 ===
27 April 2017 — Aigle to Bulle, 136.5 kilometres (84.8 mi)

Stage 2 result
Rank	Rider	Team	Time
1	Stefan Küng (SUI)	BMC Racing Team	3h 33' 15"
2	Andriy Hrivko (UKR)	Astana	+ 0"
3	Sonny Colbrelli (ITA)	Bahrain–Merida	+ 20"
4	Alex Edmondson (AUS)	Orica–Scott	+ 20"
5	Ben Swift (GBR)	UAE Team Emirates	+ 20"
6	Fabio Felline (ITA)	Trek–Segafredo	+ 20"
7	Tosh Van der Sande (BEL)	Lotto–Soudal	+ 20"
8	Jarlinson Pantano (COL)	Trek–Segafredo	+ 20"
9	Diego Ulissi (ITA)	UAE Team Emirates	+ 20"
10	Maximiliano Richeze (ARG)	Quick-Step Floors	+ 20"

General classification after stage 2
Rank	Rider	Team	Time
1	Fabio Felline (ITA)	Trek–Segafredo	8h 12' 42"
2	Maximilian Schachmann (GER)	Quick-Step Floors	+ 8"
3	Jesús Herrada (ESP)	Movistar Team	+ 8"
4	Primož Roglič (SLO)	LottoNL–Jumbo	+ 9"
5	Ion Izagirre (ESP)	Bahrain–Merida	+ 12"
6	Bob Jungels (LUX)	Quick-Step Floors	+ 12"
7	José Gonçalves (POR)	Team Katusha–Alpecin	+ 13"
8	Rubén Fernández (ESP)	Movistar Team	+ 13"
9	Michael Albasini (SUI)	Orica–Scott	+ 14"
10	Jonathan Castroviejo (ESP)	Movistar Team	+ 14"

=== Stage 3 ===
28 April 2017 — Payerne to Payerne, 187 kilometres (116 mi)

Stage 3 result
Rank	Rider	Team	Time
1	Elia Viviani (ITA)	Team Sky	4h 27' 42"
2	Sonny Colbrelli (ITA)	Bahrain–Merida	+ 0"
3	Michael Schwarzmann (GER)	Bora–Hansgrohe	+ 0"
4	Alex Edmondson (AUS)	Orica–Scott	+ 0"
5	Samuel Dumoulin (FRA)	AG2R La Mondiale	+ 0"
6	Youcef Reguigui (ALG)	Team Dimension Data	+ 0"
7	Maximiliano Richeze (ARG)	Quick-Step Floors	+ 0"
8	Moreno Hofland (NED)	Lotto–Soudal	+ 0"
9	Vyacheslav Kuznetsov (RUS)	Team Katusha–Alpecin	+ 0"
10	Juan José Lobato (ESP)	LottoNL–Jumbo	+ 0"

General classification after stage 3
Rank	Rider	Team	Time
1	Fabio Felline (ITA)	Trek–Segafredo	12h 40' 24"
2	Maximilian Schachmann (GER)	Quick-Step Floors	+ 8"
3	Jesús Herrada (ESP)	Movistar Team	+ 8"
4	Primož Roglič (SLO)	LottoNL–Jumbo	+ 9"
5	Ion Izagirre (ESP)	Bahrain–Merida	+ 12"
6	Bob Jungels (LUX)	Quick-Step Floors	+ 12"
7	José Gonçalves (POR)	Team Katusha–Alpecin	+ 13"
8	Rubén Fernández (ESP)	Movistar Team	+ 13"
9	Michael Albasini (SUI)	Orica–Scott	+ 14"
10	Jonathan Castroviejo (ESP)	Movistar Team	+ 14"

=== Stage 4 ===
29 April 2017 — Domdidier to Leysin, 163.5 kilometres (101.6 mi)

Stage 4 result
Rank	Rider	Team	Time
1	Simon Yates (GBR)	Orica–Scott	4h 10' 03"
2	Richie Porte (AUS)	BMC Racing Team	+ 0"
3	Emanuel Buchmann (GER)	Bora–Hansgrohe	+ 30"
4	Tejay van Garderen (USA)	BMC Racing Team	+ 43"
5	Rigoberto Urán (COL)	Cannondale–Drapac	+ 52"
6	Diego Ulissi (ITA)	UAE Team Emirates	+ 52"
7	Pierre Latour (FRA)	AG2R La Mondiale	+ 52"
8	Louis Meintjes (RSA)	UAE Team Emirates	+ 52"
9	Damien Howson (AUS)	Orica–Scott	+ 52"
10	David Gaudu (FRA)	FDJ	+ 52"

General classification after stage 4
Rank	Rider	Team	Time
1	Simon Yates (GBR)	Orica–Scott	16h 50' 35"
2	Richie Porte (AUS)	BMC Racing Team	+ 19"
3	Emanuel Buchmann (GER)	Bora–Hansgrohe	+ 38"
4	Fabio Felline (ITA)	Trek–Segafredo	+ 44"
5	Jesús Herrada (ESP)	Movistar Team	+ 52"
6	Primož Roglič (SLO)	LottoNL–Jumbo	+ 53"
7	Ion Izagirre (ESP)	Bahrain–Merida	+ 56"
8	Bob Jungels (LUX)	Quick-Step Floors	+ 56"
9	Diego Ulissi (ITA)	UAE Team Emirates	+ 58"
10	Damien Howson (AUS)	Orica–Scott	+ 59"

=== Stage 5 ===
30 April 2017 — Lausanne to Lausanne, 17.88 kilometres (11.11 mi), individual time trial (ITT)

Stage 5 result
Rank	Rider	Team	Time
1	Primož Roglič (SLO)	LottoNL–Jumbo	24' 58"
2	Richie Porte (AUS)	BMC Racing Team	+ 8"
3	Tejay van Garderen (USA)	BMC Racing Team	+ 34"
4	Ion Izagirre (ESP)	Bahrain–Merida	+ 34"
5	Fabio Felline (ITA)	Trek–Segafredo	+ 34"
6	Andrey Amador (CRC)	Movistar Team	+ 35"
7	Jonathan Castroviejo (ESP)	Movistar Team	+ 41"
8	Lennard Kämna (GER)	Team Sunweb	+ 42"
9	Chris Froome (GBR)	Team Sky	+ 46"
10	Ilnur Zakarin (RUS)	Team Katusha–Alpecin	+ 46"

General classification after stage 5
Rank	Rider	Team	Time
1	Richie Porte (AUS)	BMC Racing Team	17h 16' 00"
2	Simon Yates (GBR)	Orica–Scott	+ 21"
3	Primož Roglič (SLO)	LottoNL–Jumbo	+ 26"
4	Fabio Felline (ITA)	Trek–Segafredo	+ 51"
5	Ion Izagirre (ESP)	Bahrain–Merida	+ 1' 03"
6	Tejay van Garderen (USA)	BMC Racing Team	+ 1' 16"
7	Wilco Kelderman (NED)	Team Sunweb	+ 1' 21"
8	Bob Jungels (LUX)	Quick-Step Floors	+ 1' 22"
9	Jesús Herrada (ESP)	Movistar Team	+ 1' 22"
10	Emanuel Buchmann (GER)	Bora–Hansgrohe	+ 1' 24"

== Classification leadership table ==
In the Tour de Romandie, four jerseys were awarded. The general classification was calculated by adding up each cyclist's finishing times on each stage. Time bonuses were awarded to the first three finishers on road stages (stages 1–4): the stage winner won a ten-second bonus, with six and four seconds for the second and third riders respectively. No bonus seconds were awarded at intermediate sprints. The leader of the general classification received a yellow jersey. This classification was considered the most important of the Tour, and the winner of the classification was considered the winner of the race. The young rider classification was based on the general classification: the highest-ranked rider born after 1 January 1993, was the leader of the classification and wore a white jersey.

Points for the mountains classification
Position	1	2	3	4	5
Points for Category 1 S.F.	24	16	12	8	4
Points for Category 1	12	8	6	4	2
Points for Category 2	8	6	4	2	1
Points for Category 3	5	3	2	1	0

There was a mountains classification; the leader of this competition wore a pink, black and blue jersey. Over the road stages of the race, there were 16 classified climbs, each of which was ranked as first-category, second-category or third-category. The first riders to cross the summit of the climbs won points towards the mountain classification. On first-category climbs, the first five riders won points with the first of these winning 12 points. Points were also awarded to the first five riders across the summit of second-category climbs, though the winner only won 8 points. On third-category climbs, only the first four riders won points, with the first rider winning five points. For the climbs near the stage finishes at Champéry and Leysin, double points were awarded.

Points for the points classification
Position	1	2	3	4	5	6	7	8	9	10	11	12	13	14	15
Stages 2 & 3	50	30	20	18	16	14	12	10	8	7	6	5	4	3	2
Other stages	30	25	22	19	17	15	13	11	9	7	6	5	4	3	2

There was also a points classification. In the points classification, cyclists received points for finishing in the top 15 in a stage. On the flat mass-start stages; for winning a stage, a rider earned 50 points, with 30 for second, 20 for third and so on down to two points for 15th place. In the individual time trials and mountainous stages, points were awarded to the top 15 riders, with 30 points for the winner, 25 for second, 22 for third and so on down to two points for 15th place. Points towards the classification could also be accrued at intermediate sprint points during each stage; on each of the road stages, there were two intermediate sprints. The first rider in these sprints won 15 points; the second rider won 10 points; the third rider won 6 points. The winner of the classification won a green jersey.

The final individual classification was a combativity prize. After each road stage, a jury chose the rider on the basis of sportsmanship and effort in the stage. The rider was awarded a red dossard (race number) for the following stage. After the final stage, the jury chose the most combative rider of the race overall. The final classification was a team classification. This was calculated by adding together the times of the best three riders on each team in each stage.

Stage	Winner	General classification	Points classification	Mountains classification	Young rider classification	Combativity award	Team classification
P	Fabio Felline	Fabio Felline	Fabio Felline	not awarded	Alex Edmondson	not awarded	Movistar Team
1	Michael Albasini	Fabio Felline	Fabio Felline	Simon Yates	Maximilian Schachmann	Sander Armée	Movistar Team
2	Stefan Küng	Fabio Felline	Stefan Küng	Sander Armée	Maximilian Schachmann	Stefan Küng	Movistar Team
3	Elia Viviani	Fabio Felline	Stefan Küng	Sander Armée	Maximilian Schachmann	Thomas De Gendt	Movistar Team
4	Simon Yates	Simon Yates	Stefan Küng	Sander Armée	Pierre Latour	Sander Armée	Orica–Scott
5	Primož Roglič	Richie Porte	Stefan Küng	Sander Armée	Pierre Latour	Not awarded	Movistar Team
Final		Richie Porte	Stefan Küng	Sander Armée	Pierre Latour	Not awarded	Movistar Team

== Classification standings ==
=== General classification ===
Final general classification (1–10)
Rank	Rider	Team	Time
1	Richie Porte (AUS)	BMC Racing Team	17h 16' 00"
2	Simon Yates (GBR)	Orica–Scott	+ 21"
3	Primož Roglič (SLO)	LottoNL–Jumbo	+ 26"
4	Fabio Felline (ITA)	Trek–Segafredo	+ 51"
5	Ion Izagirre (ESP)	Bahrain–Merida	+ 1' 03"
6	Tejay van Garderen (USA)	BMC Racing Team	+ 1' 16"
7	Wilco Kelderman (NED)	Team Sunweb	+ 1' 21"
8	Bob Jungels (LUX)	Quick-Step Floors	+ 1' 22"
9	Jesús Herrada (ESP)	Movistar Team	+ 1' 22"
10	Emanuel Buchmann (GER)	Bora–Hansgrohe	+ 1' 24"

=== Points classification ===
Final points classification (1–10)
Rank	Rider	Team	Points
1	Stefan Küng (SWI)	BMC Racing Team	66
2	Fabio Felline (ITA)	Trek–Segafredo	65
3	Alex Edmondson (AUS)	Orica–Scott	58
4	Primož Roglič (SLO)	LottoNL–Jumbo	51
5	Richie Porte (AUS)	BMC Racing Team	50
6	Sonny Colbrelli (ITA)	Bahrain–Merida	50
7	Diego Ulissi (ITA)	UAE Team Emirates	48
8	Tejay van Garderen (USA)	BMC Racing Team	41
9	Alex Dowsett (GBR)	Movistar Team	40
10	Simon Yates (GBR)	Orica–Scott	35

=== Mountains classification ===
Final mountains classification (1–10)
Rank	Rider	Team	Points
1	Sander Armée (BEL)	Lotto–Soudal	67
2	Simon Yates (GBR)	Orica–Scott	50
3	Mikaël Cherel (FRA)	AG2R La Mondiale	22
4	Simon Clarke (AUS)	Cannondale–Drapac	19
5	Richie Porte (AUS)	BMC Racing Team	16
6	Diego Ulissi (ITA)	UAE Team Emirates	16
7	Thomas De Gendt (BEL)	Lotto–Soudal	15
8	Mekseb Debesay (ERI)	Team Dimension Data	13
9	Emanuel Buchmann (GER)	Bora–Hansgrohe	12
10	David Gaudu (FRA)	FDJ	12

=== Young rider classification ===
Final young rider classification (1–10)
Rank	Rider	Team	Time
1	Pierre Latour (FRA)	AG2R La Mondiale	17h 17' 44"
2	Maximilian Schachmann (GER)	Quick-Step Floors	+ 14"
3	Jack Haig (AUS)	Orica–Scott	+ 36"
4	Richard Carapaz (COL)	Movistar Team	+ 1' 32"
5	David Gaudu (FRA)	FDJ	+ 1' 34"
6	Anass Aït El Abdia (MAR)	UAE Team Emirates	+ 1' 35"
7	Merhawi Kudus (ERI)	Team Dimension Data	+ 2' 14"
8	Guillaume Martin (FRA)	Wanty–Groupe Gobert	+ 2' 42"
9	James Shaw (GBR)	Lotto–Soudal	+ 7' 35"
10	Matvey Mamykin	Team Katusha–Alpecin	+ 11' 55"

=== Team classification ===
Final team classification (1–10)
Rank	Team	Time
1	(Spain) Movistar Team	51h 51' 49"
2	(Australia) Orica–Scott	+ 5"
3	(Belgium) Quick-Step Floors	+ 1' 13"
4	(United States) BMC Racing Team	+ 1' 53"
5	(Switzerland) Team Katusha–Alpecin	+ 2' 59"
6	(France) AG2R La Mondiale	+ 3' 04"
7	(United Arab Emirates) UAE Team Emirates	+ 3' 08"
8	(United States) Trek–Segafredo	+ 4' 48"
9	Bahrain–Merida	+ 4' 57"
10	(Netherlands) LottoNL–Jumbo	+ 5' 42"
