= Pierre Latour =

French cyclist

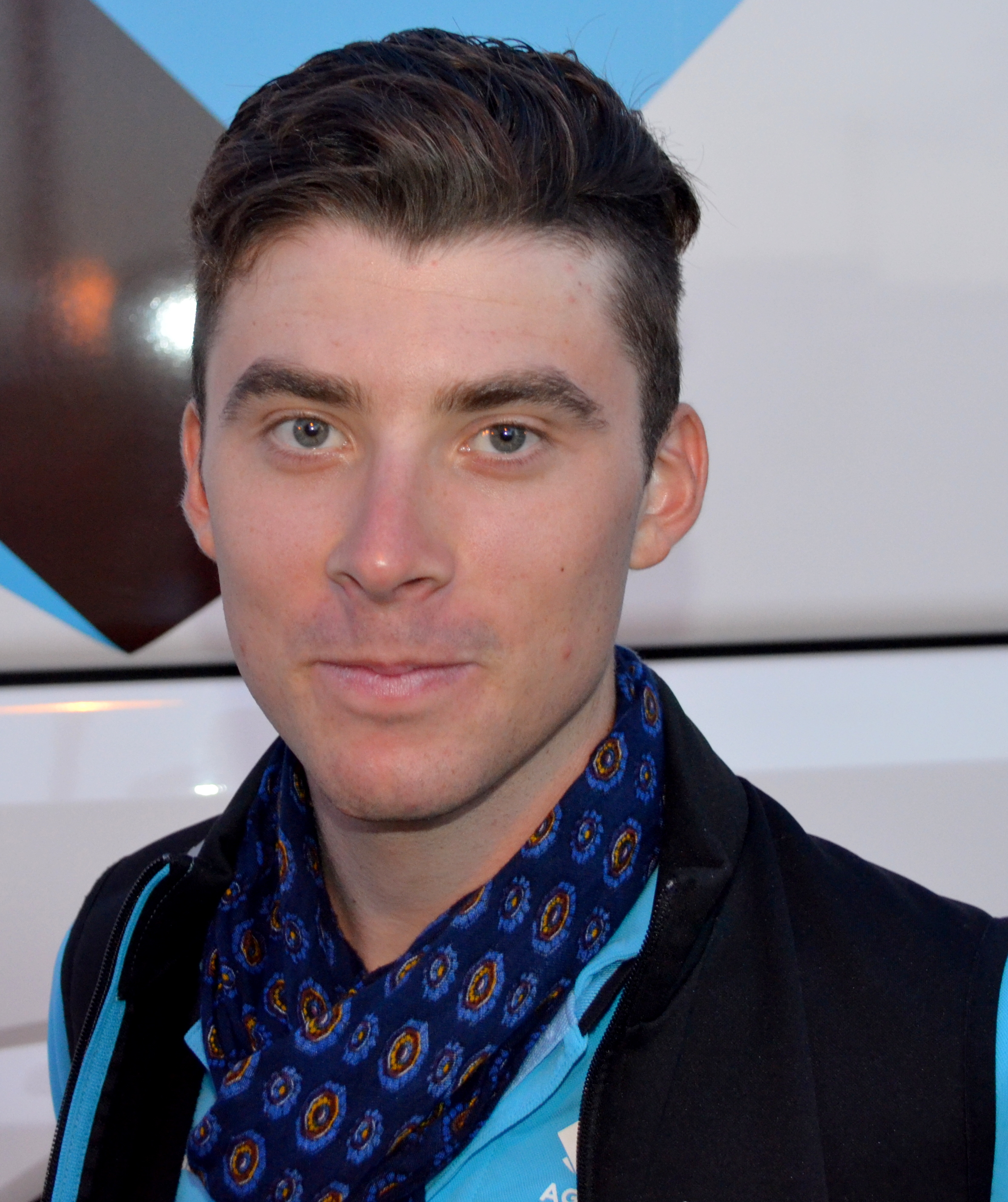
- Latour at the 2015 Tour de l'Ain

Personal information
- Full name: Pierre Latour
- Born: 12 October 1993 (age 33) Romans-sur-Isère, France
- Height: 1.80 m (5 ft 11 in)
- Weight: 64 kg (141 lb; 10 st 1 lb)

Cycling career
- Sport: Cycling
- Discipline: Road
- Role: Rider
- Rider type: All-rounder

Amateur teams
- 2010–2011: VS Romanais Péageois
- 2012–2014: Chambéry CF

Professional teams
- 2013: Ag2r–La Mondiale (stagiaire)
- 2015–2020: AG2R La Mondiale
- 2021–2025: Total Direct Énergie

Major wins
- Grand Tours Tour de France Young rider classification (2018) Vuelta a España 1 individual stage (2016) One-day races and Classics National Time Trial Championships (2017, 2018)

Pierre Latour (born 12 October 1993) is a former French cyclist who most recently rode for UCI ProTeam Team TotalEnergies. He is a stage winner of the Vuelta a España, and twice the winner of French National Time Trial Championships.

== Career ==
Latour was born in Romans-sur-Isère. Due to a clerical error when he was an amateur, Latour is more commonly known with a "Roger" in his name as Pierre-Roger Latour.

=== AG2R La Mondiale (2015–2020) ===
==== 2015 ====
In his first year as a professional rider, Latour first made his name in the Route du Sud. He had attacked on stage 3 but on the last climb of the day, he was joined by Alberto Contador and Nairo Quintana. He ended getting dropped on the descent by Contador who attacked. He finished the stage in 3rd position, and took 3rd overall at the end of the race, as well as winning the young rider classification.

==== 2016 ====
At the Tour de Romandie, Latour won the Young rider classification which was his first in a World Tour stage race. After stage 5 at the Tour de Suisse, he was in the leaders jersey but eventually abandoned the race. He was named in the startlist for the Vuelta a España, his first Grand Tour. In this race, he achieved his first Grand Tour stage victory on the penultimate stage, beating Darwin Atapuma to the finish on the Aitana climb.

==== 2017 ====
In the 2017 season, Latour once again won the Young rider classification at the Tour de Romandie. In late June he also won the French National Time Trial Championships. He was named in the startlist for the Tour de France. He had the lead in the young rider classification for 2 days before handing over the jersey to Simon Yates, who eventually ended up winning it; Latour ended 6th in the final jersey standings. He ended the year with 9th at Milano–Torino and 6th place in the Chrono des Nations.

==== 2018 ====
At the Volta a Catalunya, Latour made the podium when he placed 3rd overall, and also won the Young rider classification. He also finished 8th overall at the Tour de Romandie, and 7th overall at the Critérium du Dauphiné winning the Young rider classification. In late June, Latour won the French National Time Trial Championships for the second year in succession. In July he started his second Tour de France; he already lost time on the 1st stage, but gained back time when he finished 2nd on stage 6 behind Dan Martin. He managed to take the lead in the Young rider classification after stage 10, and won the jersey outright in Paris.

=== Total Direct Énergie ===
In August 2020, Latour signed a two-year contract with the Total Direct Énergie team, from the 2021 season.

== Major results ==
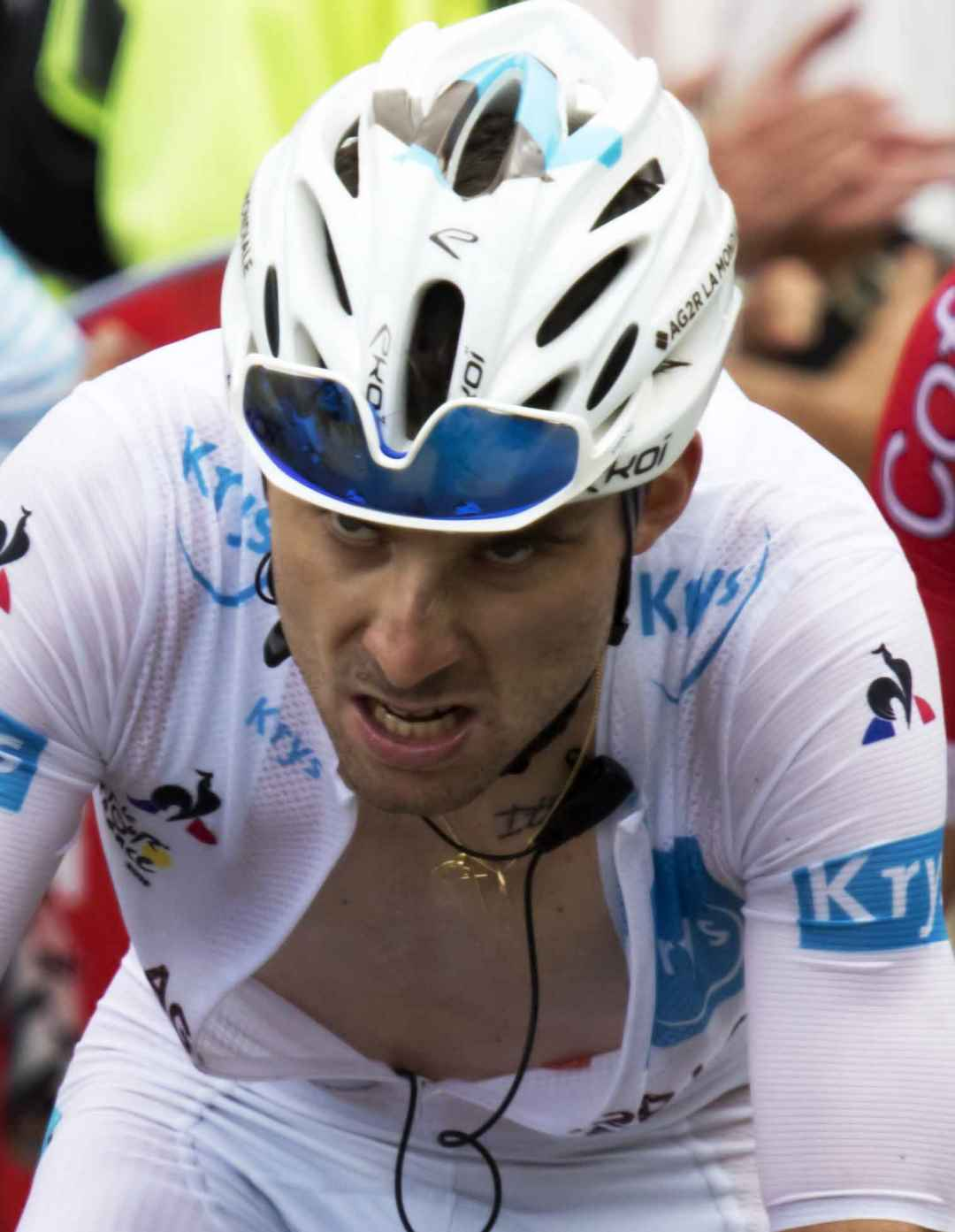
Latour wearing the white jersey at the 2018 Tour de France

2010
3rd Overall Tour du Valromey
2011
1st Classique des Alpes Juniors
2nd Road race, National Junior Road Championships
4th Overall Regio-Tour Juniors

1st Stage 1

5th Overall Trofeo Karlsberg
2013
1st Road race, Jeux de la Francophonie
4th Piccolo Giro di Lombardia
5th Tour du Doubs
6th Overall Ronde de l'Isard

1st Young rider classification

7th Overall Tour du Gévaudan Languedoc-Roussillon

1st Young rider classification

8th Overall Tour des Pays de Savoie
2014
1st Grand Prix de Saint-Lyé
1st Grand Cours-la-Ville Price
3rd Tour du Jura
3rd Piccolo Giro di Lombardia
5th Overall Tour des Pays de Savoie
6th Overall Tour de l'Avenir
9th Overall Tour de l'Ain
2015 (1 pro win)
3rd Overall Tour de l'Ain

1st Young rider classification
1st Stage 4

3rd Overall Route du Sud

1st Young rider classification

5th Overall Vuelta a Burgos
7th Overall Tour of Austria
7th Overall Étoile de Bessèges
10th Overall Tour de Picardie
2016 (1)
1st Stage 20 Vuelta a España
1st Young rider classification, Tour de Romandie
2nd Overall Critérium International

1st Young rider classification

3rd Overall Tour de l'Ain
7th Overall Étoile de Bessèges

1st Young rider classification

10th Giro di Lombardia
10th Trofeo Laigueglia
2017 (1)
1st Time trial, National Road Championships
1st Young rider classification, Tour de Romandie
3rd Tour du Finistère
4th Overall Étoile de Bessèges
5th Classic Sud-Ardèche
6th Chrono des Nations
9th Milano–Torino
Tour de France

Held after Stages 3–4

2018 (1)
National Road Championships

1st Time trial
4th Road race

1st Young rider classification, Tour de France
3rd Overall Volta a Catalunya

1st Young rider classification

6th Chrono des Nations
7th Overall Critérium du Dauphiné

1st Young rider classification

8th Overall Tour de Romandie
8th Classic de l'Ardèche
2019
6th Overall Tour de Pologne
7th Giro dell'Emilia
9th Giro di Lombardia
2020
4th Mont Ventoux Dénivelé Challenge
2021 (1)
3rd Overall Vuelta a Asturias

1st Stage 3

4th Time trial, National Road Championships
5th Overall Tour de Luxembourg
8th Chrono des Nations
2022
3rd Overall Tour Poitou-Charentes en Nouvelle-Aquitaine
4th Time trial, National Road Championships
4th Overall Étoile de Bessèges
4th Tre Valli Varesine
5th Overall Tour de la Provence
6th GP Miguel Induráin
6th Chrono des Nations
2023
3rd Time trial, National Road Championships
3rd Overall Étoile de Bessèges
10th Ardèche Classic
2024 (1)
1st Stage 5 (ITT) Tour du Rwanda
5th Time trial, National Road Championships
8th Overall Tour Poitou-Charentes en Nouvelle-Aquitaine
2025 (1)
2nd Overall Boucles de la Mayenne

1st Points classification
1st Stage 1

4th Overall Étoile de Bessèges
5th Overall Tour Poitou-Charentes en Nouvelle-Aquitaine

=== General classification results timeline ===
Grand Tour general classification results timeline
| Grand Tour | 2015 | 2016 | 2017 | 2018 | 2019 | 2020 | 2021 | 2022 | 2023 |
| Giro d'Italia | Has not contested in his career | | | | | | | | |
| Tour de France | — | — | 29 | 13 | — | DNF | 47 | 57 | 75 |
| Vuelta a España | — | 28 | — | — | 35 | — | — | — | DNF |
Major stage race general classification results timeline
| Race | 2015 | 2016 | 2017 | 2018 | 2019 | 2020 | 2021 | 2022 | 2023 |
| Paris–Nice | — | 76 | 49 | — | — | DNF | 16 | 14 | 14 |
| Tirreno–Adriatico | Has not contested during his career | | | | | | | | |
| Volta a Catalunya | 96 | — | 32 | 3 | — | NH | — | — | — |
| Tour of the Basque Country | — | 14 | — | DNF | — | NH | 22 | DNF | DNF |
| Tour de Romandie | — | 12 | 14 | 8 | — | NH | — | — | — |
| Critérium du Dauphiné | — | — | 15 | 7 | — | 70 | — | — | DNF |
| Tour de Suisse | — | DNF | — | — | DNF | NH | 11 | — | — |

=== Major championships timeline ===
| Event | | 2015 | 2016 | 2017 | 2018 | 2019 | 2020 | 2021 | 2022 | 2023 |
|---|---|---|---|---|---|---|---|---|---|---|
| World Championships | Time trial | — | — | — | — | 18 | — | — | — | |
| National Championships | Time trial | — | 10 | 1 | 1 | 14 | — | 4 | 4 | 3 |
| National Championships | Road race | DNF | 53 | 65 | 4 | 71 | 88 | DNF | DNF | DNF |

Legend
| — | Did not compete |
| DNF | Did not finish |
| IP | In progress |
| NH | Not held |
