= Eugenio Sánchez (cyclist) =

Spanish cyclist

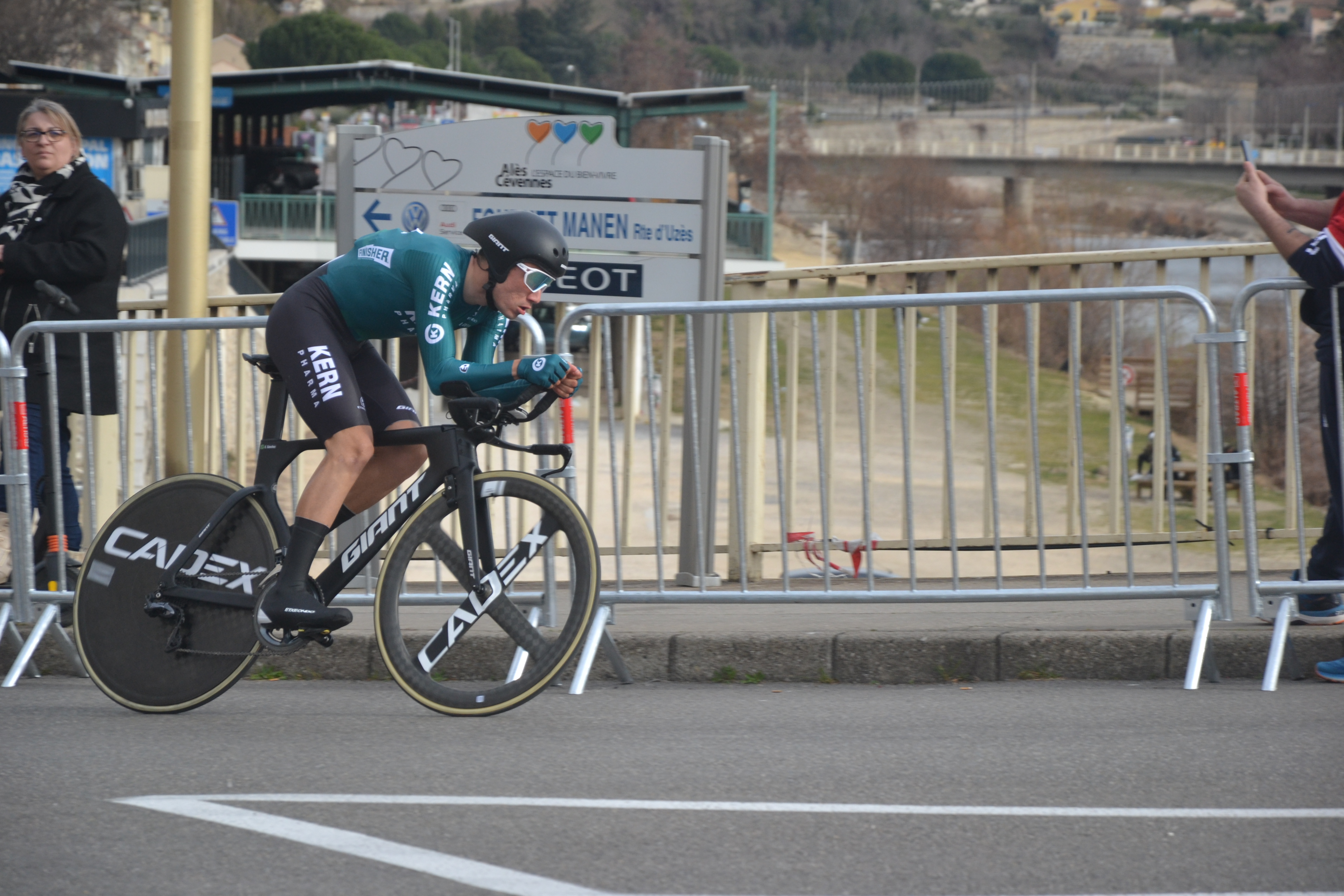
- Sánchez during the 2022 Étoile de Bessèges

Personal information
- Full name: Eugenio Sánchez López
- Born: 10 March 1999 (age 27) Albacete, Spain
- Height: 1.79 m (5 ft 10 in)
- Weight: 60 kg (132 lb)

Cycling career
- Sport: Cycling
- Current team: Equipo Kern Pharma
- Discipline: Road
- Role: Rider
- Rider type: Climber

Amateur teams
- 2014–2015: Restaurante Zafiro
- 2016–2017: Castillo de Onda
- 2018–2021: Lizarte

Professional teams
- 2021: Equipo Kern Pharma (stagiaire)
- 2022–: Equipo Kern Pharma

Eugenio Sánchez López (born 10 March 1999) is a Spanish cyclist, who currently rides for UCI ProTeam Equipo Kern Pharma.

== Major results ==
2017
1st Overall Vuelta al Besaya

1st Stage 1

2019
1st Overall Volta a Castelló

1st Stage 3

2021
1st Overall Vuelta a Zamora
