= 2023 Bretagne Classic Ouest-France =

One-day cycling race in France

2023 UCI World Tour, race 30 of 35

Race details
- Dates: 3 September 2023
- Stages: 1
- Distance: 254.86 km (158.4 mi)
- Winning time: 6h 15' 22"

Results
	Winner	Valentin Madouas (FRA)	(Groupama–FDJ)
	Second	Mathieu Burgaudeau (FRA)	(Team TotalEnergies)
	Third	Felix Großschartner (AUT)	(UAE Team Emirates)

The 2023 Bretagne Classic Ouest-France was a road cycling one-day race that took place on 3 September 2023 in the region of Brittany in northwestern France. It was the 87th edition of the Bretagne Classic Ouest-France and the 30th event of the 2023 UCI World Tour. It was won by Valentin Madouas in a four-rider sprint.

== Teams ==
All eighteen UCI WorldTeams and six UCI ProTeams made up the twenty-four teams that participated in the race.

UCI WorldTeams

- AG2R Citroën Team
- Alpecin–Deceuninck
- Arkéa–Samsic
- Astana Qazaqstan Team
- Bora–Hansgrohe
- Cofidis
- EF Education–EasyPost
- Groupama–FDJ
- Ineos Grenadiers
- Intermarché–Circus–Wanty
- Lidl–Trek
- Movistar Team
- Soudal–Quick-Step
- Team Bahrain Victorious
- Team dsm–firmenich
- Team Jayco–AlUla
- Team Jumbo–Visma
- UAE Team Emirates

UCI ProTeams

- Green Project–Bardiani–CSF–Faizanè
- Bingoal WB
- Israel–Premier Tech
- Lotto–Dstny
- Team TotalEnergies
- Tudor Pro Cycling Team

== Result ==
Result
Rank	Rider	Team	Time
1	Valentin Madouas (FRA)	Groupama–FDJ	6h 15' 22"
2	Mathieu Burgaudeau (FRA)	Team TotalEnergies	+ 0"
3	Felix Großschartner (AUT)	UAE Team Emirates	+ 0"
4	Stefan Küng (SUI)	Groupama–FDJ	+ 1"
5	Jasper De Buyst (BEL)	Lotto–Dstny	+ 17"
6	Marc Hirschi (SUI)	UAE Team Emirates	+ 17"
7	Tiesj Benoot (BEL)	Team Jumbo–Visma	+ 17"
8	Frederik Wandahl (DEN)	Bora–Hansgrohe	+ 17"
9	Elia Viviani (ITA)	Groupama–FDJ	+ 35"
10	Sandy Dujardin (FRA)	Team TotalEnergies	+ 35"
