= Vuelta a Extremadura =

Bicycle race in Spain

The Tour of Extremadura (Spanish: Vuelta Ciclista Internacional a Extremadura or Vuelta a Extremadura) was an annual multiple stage bicycle race in Spain, visiting the main towns of the Extremadura region. Beginning as an amateur event in 1987, it became part of the professional UCI Europe Tour in 2005, and was last run in 2011.

== History ==
The first race took place in 1987, although it did not become a regular event until 2002. It was restricted to amateurs until the creation of the Continental Circuits UCI in 2005, when it became part of the professional circuit of the UCI Europe Tour, in category 2.2 (the lowest professional category). The 2010 event was cancelled, and the final race took place in 2011 as an amateur event, with all its stages in the province of Badajoz, and four of the five stages started and finished in the same place.

Notable winners include José Ángel Gómez Marchante and Daniel Lloyd, both professional cyclists.

== Results ==
Year	Winner	Second	Third
1987	?	?	?
1988-1993	No race		
1994	Claus Michael MøllerDEN	?	?
1995	?	?	?
1996	?	?	?
1997	Ernesto ManchónESP	?	?
1998-1999	No race		
2000	?	?	?
2001	No race		
2002	Sergio DomínguezESP	Ricardo SerranoESP	Fredrik ModinSWE
2003	José Ángel Gómez MarchanteESP	Carlos BarredoESP	Francisco Javier AndujarESP
2004	Juan Carlos LópezCOL	Jordi GrauESP	Sergio DomínguezESP
2005	Luis Roberto ÁlvarezESP	Juan Carlos RojasCRC	Francisco José TerciadoESP
2006	Pedro Romero OcampoESP	Ángel RodríguezESP	Gustavo DomínguezESP
2007	Nuno MartaPOR	Reinier HonigNLD	José Luis CubilloESP
2008	Daniel LloydGBR	Manuel LloretESP	Sergio SousaPOR
2009	José de SegoviaESP	Luis Felipe LaverdeCOL	Bruno CastanheiraPOR
2010	No race		
2011	Gustavo PérezARG	Paul KneppersNED	Raúl García de MateosESP

== List of winners by country ==
Country	Victories
Spain	6
Denmark	1
Colombia	1
Portugal	1
United Kingdom	1
Argentina	1
