= 2022 Étoile de Bessèges =

French cycling race

2022 UCI Europe Tour

Race details
- Dates: 2–6 February 2022
- Stages: 5
- Distance: 630.06 km (391.5 mi)
- Winning time: 14h 39' 32"

Results
Jersey awarded to the overall winner	Winner	Benjamin Thomas (FRA)	(Cofidis)
	Second	Alberto Bettiol (ITA)	(EF Education–EasyPost)
	Third	Tobias Halland Johannessen (NOR)	(Uno-X Pro Cycling Team)
Jersey awarded to the points classification winner	Points	Mads Pedersen (DEN)	(Trek–Segafredo)
Jersey awarded to the mountains classification winner	Mountains	Jay Vine (AUS)	(Alpecin–Fenix)
Jersey awarded to the youth classification winner	Youth	Tobias Halland Johannessen (NOR)	(Uno-X Pro Cycling Team)
	Team	Team TotalEnergies	

The 2022 Étoile de Bessèges – Tour du Gard (transl. Star of Bessèges – Tour of Gard) was a road cycling stage race that took place between 2 and 6 February 2022 almost entirely within the French department of Gard. The race was rated as a category 2.1 event on the 2022 UCI Europe Tour calendar, and was the 52nd edition of the Étoile de Bessèges.

== Teams ==
Nine of the 18 UCI WorldTeams, nine UCI ProTeams, and three UCI Continental teams made up the 21 teams that participated in the race. Each team entered a full squad of seven riders, for a total of 147 riders who started the race, of which 123 finished.

UCI WorldTeams

- AG2R Citroën Team
- Cofidis
- EF Education–EasyPost
- Groupama–FDJ
- Ineos Grenadiers
- Intermarché–Wanty–Gobert Matériaux
- Israel–Premier Tech
- Trek–Segafredo
- UAE Team Emirates

UCI ProTeams

- Alpecin–Fenix
- Arkéa–Samsic
- B&B Hotels–KTM
- Bardiani–CSF–Faizanè
- Bingoal Pauwels Sauces WB
- Equipo Kern Pharma
- Sport Vlaanderen–Baloise
- Team TotalEnergies
- Uno-X Pro Cycling Team

UCI Continental Teams

- Go Sport–Roubaix–Lille Métropole
- St. Michel–Auber93
- Team UC Nantes Atlantique

== Route ==
Stage characteristics and winners
Stage	Date	Course	Distance	Type	Stage winner
1	2 February	Bellegarde to Bellegarde	160.86 km (99.95 mi)	Flat stage	Mads Pedersen (DEN)
2	3 February	Saint-Christol-lès-Alès to Rousson	156.21 km (97.06 mi)	Hilly stage	Bryan Coquard (FRA)
3	4 February	Bessèges to Bessèges	155.65 km (96.72 mi)	Hilly stage	Benjamin Thomas (FRA)
4	5 February	Saint-Hilaire-de-Brethmas to Mont Bouquet	146.71 km (91.16 mi)	Mountain stage	Tobias Halland Johannessen (NOR)
5	6 February	Alès to Alès	10.63 km (6.61 mi)	Individual time trial	Filippo Ganna (ITA)
Total			630.06 km (391.50 mi)		

== Stages ==
=== Stage 1 ===
2 February 2022 – Bellegarde to Bellegarde, 160.86 km (99.95 mi)

Stage 1 Result (1–10)
Rank	Rider	Team	Time
1	Mads Pedersen (DEN)	Trek–Segafredo	3h 32' 47"
2	Hugo Hofstetter (FRA)	Arkéa–Samsic	+ 1"
3	Edvald Boasson Hagen (NOR)	Team TotalEnergies	+ 1"
4	Alberto Bettiol (ITA)	EF Education–EasyPost	+ 1"
5	Mathieu Burgaudeau (FRA)	Team TotalEnergies	+ 1"
6	Chris Lawless (GBR)	Team TotalEnergies	+ 4"
7	Filippo Ganna (ITA)	Ineos Grenadiers	+ 7"
8	Benjamin Thomas (FRA)	Cofidis	+ 7"
9	Greg Van Avermaet (BEL)	AG2R Citroën Team	+ 7"
10	Toms Skujiņš (LAT)	Trek–Segafredo	+ 11"

General classification after Stage 1 (1–10)
Rank	Rider	Team	Time
1	Mads Pedersen (DEN)	Trek–Segafredo	3h 32' 37"
2	Hugo Hofstetter (FRA)	Arkéa–Samsic	+ 5"
3	Edvald Boasson Hagen (NOR)	Team TotalEnergies	+ 7"
4	Alberto Bettiol (ITA)	EF Education–EasyPost	+ 11"
5	Mathieu Burgaudeau (FRA)	Team TotalEnergies	+ 11"
6	Chris Lawless (GBR)	Team TotalEnergies	+ 14"
7	Filippo Ganna (ITA)	Ineos Grenadiers	+ 17"
8	Benjamin Thomas (FRA)	Cofidis	+ 17"
9	Greg Van Avermaet (BEL)	AG2R Citroën Team	+ 17"
10	Toms Skujiņš (LAT)	Trek–Segafredo	+ 21"

=== Stage 2 ===
3 February 2022 – Saint-Christol-lès-Alès to Rousson, 156.21 km (97.06 mi)

Stage 2 Result (1–10)
Rank	Rider	Team	Time
1	Bryan Coquard (FRA)	Cofidis	3h 41' 46"
2	Mads Pedersen (DEN)	Trek–Segafredo	+ 0"
3	Tobias Halland Johannessen (NOR)	Uno-X Pro Cycling Team	+ 0"
4	Mathieu Burgaudeau (FRA)	Team TotalEnergies	+ 0"
5	Alberto Bettiol (ITA)	EF Education–EasyPost	+ 4"
6	Benjamin Thomas (FRA)	Cofidis	+ 4"
7	Connor Swift (GBR)	Arkéa–Samsic	+ 4"
8	Milan Menten (BEL)	Bingoal Pauwels Sauces WB	+ 4"
9	Clément Champoussin (FRA)	AG2R Citroën Team	+ 4"
10	Pierre Latour (FRA)	Team TotalEnergies	+ 4"

General classification after Stage 2 (1–10)
Rank	Rider	Team	Time
1	Mads Pedersen (DEN)	Trek–Segafredo	7h 14' 17"
2	Mathieu Burgaudeau (FRA)	Team TotalEnergies	+ 17"
3	Alberto Bettiol (ITA)	EF Education–EasyPost	+ 21"
4	Benjamin Thomas (FRA)	Cofidis	+ 27"
5	Connor Swift (GBR)	Arkéa–Samsic	+ 33"
6	Edvald Boasson Hagen (NOR)	Team TotalEnergies	+ 35"
7	Pierre Latour (FRA)	Team TotalEnergies	+ 38"
8	Toms Skujiņš (LAT)	Trek–Segafredo	+ 44"
9	Bryan Coquard (FRA)	Cofidis	+ 47"
10	Richard Carapaz (ECU)	Ineos Grenadiers	+ 51"

=== Stage 3 ===
4 February 2022 – Bessèges to Bessèges, 155.65 km (96.72 mi)

Stage 3 Result (1–10)
Rank	Rider	Team	Time
1	Benjamin Thomas (FRA)	Cofidis	3h 38' 31"
2	Alberto Bettiol (ITA)	EF Education–EasyPost	+ 9"
3	Tobias Halland Johannessen (NOR)	Uno-X Pro Cycling Team	+ 9"
4	Rasmus Tiller (NOR)	Uno-X Pro Cycling Team	+ 15"
5	Bryan Coquard (FRA)	Cofidis	+ 15"
6	Edvald Boasson Hagen (NOR)	Team TotalEnergies	+ 15"
7	Hugo Hofstetter (FRA)	Arkéa–Samsic	+ 15"
8	Clément Champoussin (FRA)	AG2R Citroën Team	+ 15"
9	Diego Ulissi (ITA)	UAE Team Emirates	+ 15"
10	Georg Zimmermann (GER)	Intermarché–Wanty–Gobert Matériaux	+ 15"

General classification after Stage 3 (1–10)
Rank	Rider	Team	Time
1	Benjamin Thomas (FRA)	Cofidis	10h 53' 05"
2	Alberto Bettiol (ITA)	EF Education–EasyPost	+ 7"
3	Mathieu Burgaudeau (FRA)	Team TotalEnergies	+ 15"
4	Connor Swift (GBR)	Arkéa–Samsic	+ 31"
5	Edvald Boasson Hagen (NOR)	Team TotalEnergies	+ 33"
6	Pierre Latour (FRA)	Team TotalEnergies	+ 36"
7	Tobias Halland Johannessen (NOR)	Uno-X Pro Cycling Team	+ 41"
8	Toms Skujiņš (LAT)	Trek–Segafredo	+ 42"
9	Bryan Coquard (FRA)	Cofidis	+ 45"
10	Mads Pedersen (DEN)	Trek–Segafredo	+ 51"

=== Stage 4 ===
5 February 2022 – Saint-Hilaire-de-Brethmas to Mont Bouquet, 146.71 km (91.16 mi)

Stage 4 Result (1–10)
Rank	Rider	Team	Time
1	Tobias Halland Johannessen (NOR)	Uno-X Pro Cycling Team	3h 30' 22"
2	Jay Vine (AUS)	Alpecin–Fenix	+ 0"
3	Antonio Tiberi (ITA)	Trek–Segafredo	+ 0"
4	Clément Champoussin (FRA)	AG2R Citroën Team	+ 0"
5	Pierre Latour (FRA)	Team TotalEnergies	+ 12"
6	Diego Ulissi (ITA)	UAE Team Emirates	+ 20"
7	Bauke Mollema (NED)	Trek–Segafredo	+ 20"
8	Alessandro Verre (ITA)	Arkéa–Samsic	+ 21"
9	Sébastien Reichenbach (SUI)	Groupama–FDJ	+ 21"
10	Alberto Bettiol (ITA)	EF Education–EasyPost	+ 23"

General classification after Stage 4 (1–10)
Rank	Rider	Team	Time
1	Benjamin Thomas (FRA)	Cofidis	14h 23' 50"
2	Alberto Bettiol (ITA)	EF Education–EasyPost	+ 7"
3	Tobias Halland Johannessen (NOR)	Uno-X Pro Cycling Team	+ 8"
4	Pierre Latour (FRA)	Team TotalEnergies	+ 25"
5	Mathieu Burgaudeau (FRA)	Team TotalEnergies	+ 26"
6	Connor Swift (GBR)	Arkéa–Samsic	+ 56"
7	Diego Ulissi (ITA)	UAE Team Emirates	+ 56"
8	Toms Skujiņš (LAT)	Trek–Segafredo	+ 1' 13"
9	Thibault Guernalec (FRA)	Arkéa–Samsic	+ 1' 14"
10	Quentin Pacher (FRA)	Groupama–FDJ	+ 1' 16"

=== Stage 5 ===
6 February 2022 – Alès to Alès, 10.63 km (6.61 mi), (ITT)

Stage 5 Result (1–10)
Rank	Rider	Team	Time
1	Filippo Ganna (ITA)	Ineos Grenadiers	15' 32"
2	Mads Pedersen (DEN)	Trek–Segafredo	+ 6"
3	Benjamin Thomas (FRA)	Cofidis	+ 9"
4	Bauke Mollema (NED)	Trek–Segafredo	+ 11"
5	Thibault Guernalec (FRA)	Arkéa–Samsic	+ 17"
6	Alberto Bettiol (ITA)	EF Education–EasyPost	+ 18"
7	Pierre Latour (FRA)	Team TotalEnergies	+ 19"
8	Jay Vine (AUS)	Alpecin–Fenix	+ 21"
9	Diego Ulissi (ITA)	UAE Team Emirates	+ 22"
10	Antonio Tiberi (ITA)	Trek–Segafredo	+ 23"

General classification after Stage 5 (1–10)
Rank	Rider	Team	Time
1	Benjamin Thomas (FRA)	Cofidis	14h 39' 32"
2	Alberto Bettiol (ITA)	EF Education–EasyPost	+ 16"
3	Tobias Halland Johannessen (NOR)	Uno-X Pro Cycling Team	+ 32"
4	Pierre Latour (FRA)	Team TotalEnergies	+ 34"
5	Mathieu Burgaudeau (FRA)	Team TotalEnergies	+ 1' 02"
6	Diego Ulissi (ITA)	UAE Team Emirates	+ 1' 09"
7	Connor Swift (GBR)	Arkéa–Samsic	+ 1' 13"
8	Thibault Guernalec (FRA)	Arkéa–Samsic	+ 1' 22"
9	Toms Skujiņš (LAT)	Trek–Segafredo	+ 1' 48"
10	Quentin Pacher (FRA)	Groupama–FDJ	+ 1' 56"

== Classification leadership table ==
Classification leadership by stage
Stage	Winner	General classification (Note: The general classification leader's jersey is known as the coral jersey.)	Points classification	Mountains classification	Young rider classification	Team classification
1	Mads Pedersen	Mads Pedersen	Mads Pedersen	Matis Louvel	Arne Marit	Team TotalEnergies
2	Bryan Coquard	Mads Pedersen	Mads Pedersen	Martí Márquez	Tobias Halland Johannessen	Team TotalEnergies
3	Benjamin Thomas	Benjamin Thomas	Alberto Bettiol	Jérémy Cabot	Tobias Halland Johannessen	Team TotalEnergies
4	Tobias Halland Johannessen	Benjamin Thomas	Tobias Halland Johannessen	Jérémy Cabot	Tobias Halland Johannessen	Team TotalEnergies
5	Filippo Ganna	Benjamin Thomas	Mads Pedersen	Jay Vine	Tobias Halland Johannessen	Team TotalEnergies
Final		Benjamin Thomas	Mads Pedersen	Jay Vine	Tobias Halland Johannessen	Team TotalEnergies

- On stage 2, Hugo Hofstetter, who was second in the points classification, wore the yellow jersey, because first-placed Mads Pedersen wore the coral jersey as the leader of the general classification. For the same reason, Mathieu Burgaudeau wore the yellow jersey on stage 3.
- After stage 3, Bruno Armirail was deemed to be leading the mountains classification and was presented with the blue jersey after the stage. However, before stage 4, the results of the KOM sprint atop the Col de Portes from stage 3 were corrected, so Jérémy Cabot became the new leader of the mountains classification and wore the blue jersey on stage 4.
- On stage 5, Pau Miquel, who was second in the young rider classification, wore the white jersey, because first-placed Tobias Halland Johannessen wore the yellow jersey as the leader of the points classification.

== Final classification standings ==
Legend
Denotes the winner of the general classification	Denotes the winner of the mountains classification
Denotes the winner of the points classification	Denotes the winner of the young rider classification

=== General classification ===
Final general classification (1–10)
Rank	Rider	Team	Time
1	Benjamin Thomas (FRA)	Cofidis	14h 39' 32"
2	Alberto Bettiol (ITA)	EF Education–EasyPost	+ 16"
3	Tobias Halland Johannessen (NOR)	Uno-X Pro Cycling Team	+ 32"
4	Pierre Latour (FRA)	Team TotalEnergies	+ 34"
5	Mathieu Burgaudeau (FRA)	Team TotalEnergies	+ 1' 02"
6	Diego Ulissi (ITA)	UAE Team Emirates	+ 1' 09"
7	Connor Swift (GBR)	Arkéa–Samsic	+ 1' 13"
8	Thibault Guernalec (FRA)	Arkéa–Samsic	+ 1' 22"
9	Toms Skujiņš (LAT)	Trek–Segafredo	+ 1' 48"
10	Quentin Pacher (FRA)	Groupama–FDJ	+ 1' 56"

=== Points classification ===
Final points classification (1–10)
Rank	Rider	Team	Points
1	Mads Pedersen (DEN)	Trek–Segafredo	65
2	Benjamin Thomas (FRA)	Cofidis	64
3	Alberto Bettiol (ITA)	EF Education–EasyPost	62
4	Tobias Halland Johannessen (NOR)	Uno-X Pro Cycling Team	58
5	Bryan Coquard (FRA)	Cofidis	37
6	Pierre Latour (FRA)	Team TotalEnergies	36
7	Filippo Ganna (ITA)	Ineos Grenadiers	34
8	Clément Champoussin (FRA)	AG2R Citroën Team	34
9	Jay Vine (AUS)	Alpecin–Fenix	31
10	Hugo Hofstetter (FRA)	Arkéa–Samsic	29

=== Mountains classification ===
Final mountains classification (1–10)
Rank	Rider	Team	Points
1	Jay Vine (AUS)	Alpecin–Fenix	18
2	Jérémy Cabot (FRA)	Team TotalEnergies	18
3	Tobias Halland Johannessen (NOR)	Uno-X Pro Cycling Team	14
4	Magnus Sheffield (USA)	Ineos Grenadiers	14
5	Antonio Tiberi (ITA)	Trek–Segafredo	14
6	Bruno Armirail (FRA)	Groupama–FDJ	12
7	Samuele Zoccarato (ITA)	Bardiani–CSF–Faizanè	12
8	Georg Zimmermann (GER)	Intermarché–Wanty–Gobert Matériaux	8
9	Martí Márquez (ESP)	Equipo Kern Pharma	8
10	Alexis Gougeard (FRA)	B&B Hotels–KTM	7

=== Young rider classification ===
Final young rider classification (1–10)
Rank	Rider	Team	Time
1	Tobias Halland Johannessen (NOR)	Uno-X Pro Cycling Team	14h 40' 04"
2	Pau Miquel (ESP)	Equipo Kern Pharma	+ 5' 02"
3	Louis Barré (FRA)	Team UC Nantes Atlantique	+ 5' 49"
4	Paul Lapeira (FRA)	AG2R Citroën Team	+ 5' 56"
5	Matis Louvel (FRA)	Arkéa–Samsic	+ 6' 14"
6	Daniel Méndez (COL)	Equipo Kern Pharma	+ 6' 40"
7	Magnus Sheffield (USA)	Ineos Grenadiers	+ 6' 49"
8	Corbin Strong (NZL)	Israel–Premier Tech	+ 7' 12"
9	Arne Marit (BEL)	Sport Vlaanderen–Baloise	+ 9' 36"
10	Antonio Tiberi (ITA)	Trek–Segafredo	+ 10' 15"

=== Team classification ===
Final team classification (1–10)
Rank	Team	Time
1	Team TotalEnergies	44h 02' 28"
2	Trek–Segafredo	+ 13"
3	Cofidis	+ 1' 02"
4	Arkéa–Samsic	+ 1' 02"
5	Groupama–FDJ	+ 1' 33"
6	AG2R Citroën Team	+ 3' 36"
7	Equipo Kern Pharma	+ 8' 14"
8	Uno-X Pro Cycling Team	+ 14' 38"
9	B&B Hotels–KTM	+ 15' 58"
10	Bingoal Pauwels Sauces WB	+ 16' 39"
