= 2022 Paris–Nice =

French cycling race

2022 UCI World Tour, race 4 of 32

Race details
- Dates: 6–13 March 2022
- Stages: 8
- Distance: 1,196.4 km (743.4 mi)
- Winning time: 29h 19' 15"

Results
Jersey awarded to the overall winner	Winner	Primož Roglič (SLO)	(Team Jumbo–Visma)
	Second	Simon Yates (GBR)	(Team BikeExchange–Jayco)
	Third	Daniel Martínez (COL)	(INEOS Grenadiers)
Jersey awarded to the points classification winner	Points	Wout van Aert (BEL)	(Team Jumbo–Visma)
Jersey awarded to the mountains classification winner	Mountains	Valentin Madouas (FRA)	(Groupama–FDJ)
Jersey awarded to the young rider classification winner	Young rider	João Almeida (POR)	(UAE Team Emirates)
	Team	UAE Team Emirates	

The 2022 Paris–Nice was a road cycling stage race that took place between 6 and 13 March 2022 in France. It was the 80th edition of Paris–Nice and the fourth race of the 2022 UCI World Tour.

== Teams ==
All 18 UCI WorldTeams and four UCI ProTeams made up the 22 teams that participated in the race. Each team entered a full squad of seven riders, for a total of 154 riders who started the race.

A wave of flu-like symptoms, although with no positive COVID-19 test results, resulted in an unusually high attrition rate as many riders were forced to withdraw from the race. A total of 37 riders withdrew before the final stage or abandoned during the stage, as most of them were not in contention for any of the final classifications. As a result, only 59 riders finished the race, which was the fewest number since the 1985 edition.

UCI WorldTeams

- AG2R Citroën Team
- Astana Qazaqstan Team
- Bora–Hansgrohe
- Cofidis
- EF Education–EasyPost
- Groupama–FDJ
- INEOS Grenadiers
- Intermarché–Wanty–Gobert Matériaux
- Israel–Premier Tech
- Lotto–Soudal
- Movistar Team
- Quick-Step Alpha Vinyl Team
- Team Bahrain Victorious
- Team BikeExchange–Jayco
- Team DSM
- Team Jumbo–Visma
- Trek–Segafredo
- UAE Team Emirates

UCI ProTeams

- Alpecin–Fenix
- Arkéa–Samsic
- B&B Hotels–KTM
- Team TotalEnergies

== Route ==
Stage characteristics and winners
Stage	Date	Course	Distance	Type	Winner
1	6 March	Mantes-la-Ville to Mantes-la-Ville	159.8 km (99.3 mi)	Flat stage	Christophe Laporte (FRA)
2	7 March	Auffargis to Orléans	159.2 km (98.9 mi)	Flat stage	Fabio Jakobsen (NED)
3	8 March	Vierzon to Dun-le-Palestel	190.8 km (118.6 mi)	Hilly stage	Mads Pedersen (DEN)
4	9 March	Domérat to Montluçon	13.4 km (8.3 mi)	Individual time trial	Wout van Aert (BEL)
5	10 March	Saint-Just-Saint-Rambert to Saint-Sauveur-de-Montagut	188.8 km (117.3 mi)	Intermediate stage	Brandon McNulty (USA)
6	11 March	Courthézon to Aubagne	213.6 km (132.7 mi)	Hilly stage	Mathieu Burgaudeau (FRA)
7	12 March	Nice to Col de Turini - La Bollène-Vésubie	155.2 km (96.4 mi)	Mountain stage	Primož Roglič (SLO)
8	13 March	Nice to Nice	115.6 km (71.8 mi)	Mountain stage	Simon Yates (GBR)
Total			1,196.4 km (743.4 mi)		

== Stages ==
=== Stage 1 ===
6 March 2022 — Mantes-la-Ville to Mantes-la-Ville, 159.8 km (99.3 mi)

Stage 1 Result (1–10)
Rank	Rider	Team	Time
1	Christophe Laporte (FRA)	Team Jumbo–Visma	3h 48' 38"
2	Primož Roglič (SLO)	Team Jumbo–Visma	+ 0"
3	Wout van Aert (BEL)	Team Jumbo–Visma	+ 0"
4	Pierre Latour (FRA)	Team TotalEnergies	+ 19"
5	Mads Pedersen (DEN)	Trek–Segafredo	+ 22"
6	Biniam Girmay (ERI)	Intermarché–Wanty–Gobert Matériaux	+ 22"
7	Iván García Cortina (ESP)	Movistar Team	+ 22"
8	Fred Wright (GBR)	Team Bahrain Victorious	+ 22"
9	Jasper Philipsen (BEL)	Alpecin–Fenix	+ 22"
10	Florian Sénéchal (FRA)	Quick-Step Alpha Vinyl Team	+ 22"

General classification after Stage 1 (1–10)
Rank	Rider	Team	Time
1	Christophe Laporte (FRA)	Team Jumbo–Visma	3h 48' 28"
2	Primož Roglič (SLO)	Team Jumbo–Visma	+ 4"
3	Wout van Aert (BEL)	Team Jumbo–Visma	+ 6"
4	Pierre Latour (FRA)	Team TotalEnergies	+ 29"
5	Mads Pedersen (DEN)	Trek–Segafredo	+ 32"
6	Biniam Girmay (ERI)	Intermarché–Wanty–Gobert Matériaux	+ 32"
7	Iván García Cortina (ESP)	Movistar Team	+ 32"
8	Fred Wright (GBR)	Team Bahrain Victorious	+ 32"
9	Jasper Philipsen (BEL)	Alpecin–Fenix	+ 32"
10	Florian Sénéchal (FRA)	Quick-Step Alpha Vinyl Team	+ 32"

=== Stage 2 ===
7 March 2022 — Auffargis to Orléans, 159.2 km (98.9 mi)

Stage 2 Result (1–10)
Rank	Rider	Team	Time
1	Fabio Jakobsen (NED)	Quick-Step Alpha Vinyl Team	3h 22' 54"
2	Wout van Aert (BEL)	Team Jumbo–Visma	+ 0"
3	Christophe Laporte (FRA)	Team Jumbo–Visma	+ 0"
4	Luka Mezgec (SLO)	Team BikeExchange–Jayco	+ 0"
5	Mads Pedersen (DEN)	Trek–Segafredo	+ 0"
6	Jasper Stuyven (BEL)	Trek–Segafredo	+ 0"
7	Luca Mozzato (ITA)	B&B Hotels–KTM	+ 0"
8	Juan Sebastián Molano (COL)	UAE Team Emirates	+ 0"
9	Oliver Naesen (BEL)	AG2R Citroën Team	+ 0"
10	Cees Bol (NED)	Team DSM	+ 0"

General classification after Stage 2 (1–10)
Rank	Rider	Team	Time
1	Christophe Laporte (FRA)	Team Jumbo–Visma	7h 11' 15"
2	Wout van Aert (BEL)	Team Jumbo–Visma	+ 5"
3	Primož Roglič (SLO)	Team Jumbo–Visma	+ 11"
4	Pierre Latour (FRA)	Team TotalEnergies	+ 36"
5	Zdeněk Štybar (CZE)	Quick-Step Alpha Vinyl Team	+ 38"
6	Mads Pedersen (DEN)	Trek–Segafredo	+ 39"
7	Jasper Stuyven (BEL)	Trek–Segafredo	+ 39"
8	Florian Sénéchal (FRA)	Quick-Step Alpha Vinyl Team	+ 39"
9	Bryan Coquard (FRA)	Cofidis	+ 39"
10	Aleksandr Vlasov^{[a]}	Bora–Hansgrohe	+ 39"

=== Stage 3 ===
8 March 2022 — Vierzon to Dun-le-Palestel, 190.8 km (118.6 mi)

Stage 3 Result (1–10)
Rank	Rider	Team	Time
1	Mads Pedersen (DEN)	Trek–Segafredo	4h 23' 29"
2	Bryan Coquard (FRA)	Cofidis	+ 0"
3	Wout van Aert (BEL)	Team Jumbo–Visma	+ 0"
4	Jasper Philipsen (BEL)	Alpecin–Fenix	+ 0"
5	Anthony Turgis (FRA)	Team TotalEnergies	+ 0"
6	Biniam Girmay (ERI)	Intermarché–Wanty–Gobert Matériaux	+ 0"
7	Fred Wright (GBR)	Team Bahrain Victorious	+ 0"
8	Danny van Poppel (NED)	Bora–Hansgrohe	+ 0"
9	Ethan Hayter (GBR)	INEOS Grenadiers	+ 0"
10	Juan Sebastián Molano (COL)	UAE Team Emirates	+ 0"

General classification after Stage 3 (1–10)
Rank	Rider	Team	Time
1	Christophe Laporte (FRA)	Team Jumbo–Visma	11h 34' 44"
2	Wout van Aert (BEL)	Team Jumbo–Visma	+ 1"
3	Primož Roglič (SLO)	Team Jumbo–Visma	+ 9"
4	Mads Pedersen (DEN)	Trek–Segafredo	+ 29"
5	Bryan Coquard (FRA)	Cofidis	+ 33"
6	Pierre Latour (FRA)	Team TotalEnergies	+ 33"
7	Zdeněk Štybar (CZE)	Quick-Step Alpha Vinyl Team	+ 38"
8	Jasper Stuyven (BEL)	Trek–Segafredo	+ 39"
9	Aleksandr Vlasov^{[a]}	Bora–Hansgrohe	+ 39"
10	Florian Sénéchal (FRA)	Quick-Step Alpha Vinyl Team	+ 39"

=== Stage 4 ===
9 March 2022 — Domérat to Montluçon, 13.4 km (8.3 mi) (ITT)

Stage 4 Result (1–10)
Rank	Rider	Team	Time
1	Wout van Aert (BEL)	Team Jumbo–Visma	16' 20"
2	Primož Roglič (SLO)	Team Jumbo–Visma	+ 2"
3	Rohan Dennis (AUS)	Team Jumbo–Visma	+ 6"
4	Stefan Küng (SUI)	Groupama–FDJ	+ 10"
5	Simon Yates (GBR)	Team BikeExchange–Jayco	+ 11"
6	Ethan Hayter (GBR)	INEOS Grenadiers	+ 14"
7	Pierre Latour (FRA)	Team TotalEnergies	+ 19"
8	Stefan Bissegger (SUI)	EF Education–EasyPost	+ 21"
9	Mads Pedersen (DEN)	Trek–Segafredo	+ 25"
10	Daniel Martínez (COL)	INEOS Grenadiers	+ 28"

General classification after Stage 4 (1–10)
Rank	Rider	Team	Time
1	Wout van Aert (BEL)	Team Jumbo–Visma	11h 51' 05"
2	Primož Roglič (SLO)	Team Jumbo–Visma	+ 10"
3	Christophe Laporte (FRA)	Team Jumbo–Visma	+ 28"
4	Simon Yates (GBR)	Team BikeExchange–Jayco	+ 49"
5	Pierre Latour (FRA)	Team TotalEnergies	+ 51"
6	Mads Pedersen (DEN)	Trek–Segafredo	+ 53"
7	Daniel Martínez (COL)	INEOS Grenadiers	+ 1' 06"
8	Aleksandr Vlasov^{[a]}	Bora–Hansgrohe	+ 1' 09"
9	Stefan Bissegger (SUI)	EF Education–EasyPost	+ 1' 13"
10	Søren Kragh Andersen (DEN)	Team DSM	+ 1' 19"

=== Stage 5 ===
10 March 2022 — Saint-Just-Saint-Rambert to Saint-Sauveur-de-Montagut, 188.8 km (117.3 mi)

Stage 5 Result (1–10)
Rank	Rider	Team	Time
1	Brandon McNulty (USA)	UAE Team Emirates	4h 53' 30"
2	Franck Bonnamour (FRA)	B&B Hotels–KTM	+ 1' 58"
3	Matteo Jorgenson (USA)	Movistar Team	+ 1' 58"
4	Harm Vanhoucke (BEL)	Lotto–Soudal	+ 2' 30"
5	Laurent Pichon (FRA)	Arkéa–Samsic	+ 4' 01"
6	Anthony Turgis (FRA)	Team TotalEnergies	+ 4' 02"
7	Valentin Madouas (FRA)	Groupama–FDJ	+ 4' 57"
8	Owain Doull (GBR)	EF Education–EasyPost	+ 4' 57"
9	Pierre Latour (FRA)	Team TotalEnergies	+ 5' 43"
10	Quentin Pacher (FRA)	Groupama–FDJ	+ 5' 43"

General classification after Stage 5 (1–10)
Rank	Rider	Team	Time
1	Primož Roglič (SLO)	Team Jumbo–Visma	16h 50' 28"
2	Simon Yates (GBR)	Team BikeExchange–Jayco	+ 39"
3	Pierre Latour (FRA)	Team TotalEnergies	+ 41"
4	Daniel Martínez (COL)	INEOS Grenadiers	+ 56"
5	Aleksandr Vlasov^{[a]}	Bora–Hansgrohe	+ 59"
6	Adam Yates (GBR)	INEOS Grenadiers	+ 1' 11"
7	Søren Kragh Andersen (DEN)	Team DSM	+ 1' 26"
8	Jack Haig (AUS)	Team Bahrain Victorious	+ 1' 35"
9	Nairo Quintana (COL)	Arkéa–Samsic	+ 1' 45"
10	Ion Izagirre (ESP)	Cofidis	+ 2' 01"

=== Stage 6 ===
11 March 2022 — Courthézon to Aubagne, 213.6 km (132.7 mi)

Stage 6 Result (1–10)
Rank	Rider	Team	Time
1	Mathieu Burgaudeau (FRA)	Team TotalEnergies	5h 33' 06"
2	Mads Pedersen (DEN)	Trek–Segafredo	+ 0"
3	Wout van Aert (BEL)	Team Jumbo–Visma	+ 0"
4	Biniam Girmay (ERI)	Intermarché–Wanty–Gobert Matériaux	+ 0"
5	Bryan Coquard (FRA)	Cofidis	+ 0"
6	Luka Mezgec (SLO)	Team BikeExchange–Jayco	+ 0"
7	Iván García Cortina (ESP)	Movistar Team	+ 0"
8	Dorian Godon (FRA)	AG2R Citroën Team	+ 0"
9	Florian Sénéchal (FRA)	Quick-Step Alpha Vinyl Team	+ 0"
10	Luca Mozzato (ITA)	B&B Hotels–KTM	+ 0"

General classification after Stage 6 (1–10)
Rank	Rider	Team	Time
1	Primož Roglič (SLO)	Team Jumbo–Visma	22h 23' 34"
2	Simon Yates (GBR)	Team BikeExchange–Jayco	+ 39"
3	Pierre Latour (FRA)	Team TotalEnergies	+ 41"
4	Daniel Martínez (COL)	INEOS Grenadiers	+ 56"
5	Aleksandr Vlasov^{[a]}	Bora–Hansgrohe	+ 59"
6	Adam Yates (GBR)	INEOS Grenadiers	+ 1' 11"
7	Søren Kragh Andersen (DEN)	Team DSM	+ 1' 26"
8	Jack Haig (AUS)	Team Bahrain Victorious	+ 1' 35"
9	Nairo Quintana (COL)	Arkéa–Samsic	+ 1' 45"
10	Ion Izagirre (ESP)	Cofidis	+ 2' 01"

=== Stage 7 ===
12 March 2022 — Nice to Col de Turini - La Bollène-Vésubie, 155.2 km (96.4 mi)

Stage 7 Result (1–10)
Rank	Rider	Team	Time
1	Primož Roglič (SLO)	Team Jumbo–Visma	4h 02' 47"
2	Daniel Martínez (COL)	INEOS Grenadiers	+ 0"
3	Simon Yates (GBR)	Team BikeExchange–Jayco	+ 2"
4	Nairo Quintana (COL)	Arkéa–Samsic	+ 9"
5	João Almeida (POR)	UAE Team Emirates	+ 11"
6	Brandon McNulty (USA)	UAE Team Emirates	+ 25"
7	Jack Haig (AUS)	Team Bahrain Victorious	+ 27"
8	Adam Yates (GBR)	INEOS Grenadiers	+ 29"
9	Guillaume Martin (FRA)	Cofidis	+ 44"
10	Wout Poels (NED)	Team Bahrain Victorious	+ 56"

General classification after Stage 7 (1–10)
Rank	Rider	Team	Time
1	Primož Roglič (SLO)	Team Jumbo–Visma	26h 26' 11"
2	Simon Yates (GBR)	Team BikeExchange–Jayco	+ 47"
3	Daniel Martínez (COL)	INEOS Grenadiers	+ 1' 00"
4	Adam Yates (GBR)	INEOS Grenadiers	+ 1' 50"
5	Nairo Quintana (COL)	Arkéa–Samsic	+ 2' 04"
6	Jack Haig (AUS)	Team Bahrain Victorious	+ 2' 12"
7	Aleksandr Vlasov^{[a]}	Bora–Hansgrohe	+ 2' 22"
8	Pierre Latour (FRA)	Team TotalEnergies	+ 2' 56"
9	Ion Izagirre (ESP)	Cofidis	+ 3' 13"
10	João Almeida (POR)	UAE Team Emirates	+ 3' 29"

=== Stage 8 ===
13 March 2022 — Nice to Nice, 115.6 km (71.8 mi)

Stage 8 Result (1–10)
Rank	Rider	Team	Time
1	Simon Yates (GBR)	Team BikeExchange–Jayco	2h 52' 59"
2	Wout van Aert (BEL)	Team Jumbo–Visma	+ 9"
3	Primož Roglič (SLO)	Team Jumbo–Visma	+ 9"
4	Brandon McNulty (USA)	UAE Team Emirates	+ 1' 44"
5	Søren Kragh Andersen (DEN)	Team DSM	+ 1' 44"
6	Stefan Küng (SUI)	Groupama–FDJ	+ 1' 44"
7	Aurélien Paret-Peintre (FRA)	AG2R Citroën Team	+ 1' 44"
8	Adam Yates (GBR)	INEOS Grenadiers	+ 1' 44"
9	Wout Poels (NED)	Team Bahrain Victorious	+ 1' 44"
10	Ion Izagirre (ESP)	Cofidis	+ 1' 44"

General classification after Stage 8 (1–10)
Rank	Rider	Team	Time
1	Primož Roglič (SLO)	Team Jumbo–Visma	29h 19' 15"
2	Simon Yates (GBR)	Team BikeExchange–Jayco	+ 29"
3	Daniel Martínez (COL)	INEOS Grenadiers	+ 2' 37"
4	Adam Yates (GBR)	INEOS Grenadiers	+ 3' 29"
5	Nairo Quintana (COL)	Arkéa–Samsic	+ 3' 43"
6	Jack Haig (AUS)	Team Bahrain Victorious	+ 3' 51"
7	Ion Izagirre (ESP)	Cofidis	+ 4' 52"
8	João Almeida (POR)	UAE Team Emirates	+ 5' 43"
9	Guillaume Martin (FRA)	Cofidis	+ 5' 48"
10	Aurélien Paret-Peintre (FRA)	AG2R Citroën Team	+ 6' 32"

== Classification leadership table ==
Classification leadership by stage
Stage	Winner	General classification	Points classification	Mountains classification	Young rider classification	Team classification	Combativity award
1	Christophe Laporte	Christophe Laporte	Christophe Laporte	Matthew Holmes	Biniam Girmay	Team Jumbo–Visma	Matthew Holmes
2	Fabio Jakobsen	Christophe Laporte	Christophe Laporte	Matthew Holmes	Stan Dewulf	Team Jumbo–Visma	Philippe Gilbert
3	Mads Pedersen	Christophe Laporte	Wout van Aert	Matthew Holmes	Stan Dewulf	Team Jumbo–Visma	Alexis Gougeard
4	Wout Van Aert	Wout Van Aert	Wout van Aert	Matthew Holmes	Stefan Bissegger	Team Jumbo–Visma	not awarded
5	Brandon McNulty	Primož Roglič	Wout van Aert	Valentin Madouas	Matteo Jorgenson	UAE Team Emirates	Brandon McNulty
6	Mathieu Burgaudeau	Primož Roglič	Wout van Aert	Valentin Madouas	Matteo Jorgenson	Team TotalEnergies	Victor Koretzky
7	Primož Roglič	Primož Roglič	Wout van Aert	Valentin Madouas	João Almeida	UAE Team Emirates	Gregor Mühlberger
8	Simon Yates	Primož Roglič	Wout van Aert	Valentin Madouas	João Almeida	UAE Team Emirates	Simon Yates
Final		Primož Roglič	Wout van Aert	Valentin Madouas	João Almeida	UAE Team Emirates	not awarded

- On stage 2, Primož Roglič, who was second in the points classification, wore the green jersey, because first-placed Christophe Laporte wore the yellow jersey as the leader of the general classification. On stage 3, Fabio Jakobsen wore the green jersey for the same reason.
- On stage 5, Mads Pedersen, who was second in the points classification, wore the green jersey, because first-placed Wout van Aert wore the yellow jersey as the leader of the general classification.

== Final classification standings ==
Legend
Denotes the winner of the general classification	Denotes the winner of the young rider classification
Denotes the winner of the points classification	Denotes the winner of the team classification
Denotes the winner of the mountains classification	Denotes the winner of the combativity award

=== General classification ===
Final general classification (1–10)
Rank	Rider	Team	Time
1	Primož Roglič (SLO)	Team Jumbo–Visma	29h 19' 15"
2	Simon Yates (GBR)	Team BikeExchange–Jayco	+ 29"
3	Daniel Martínez (COL)	INEOS Grenadiers	+ 2' 37"
4	Adam Yates (GBR)	INEOS Grenadiers	+ 3' 29"
5	Nairo Quintana (COL)	Arkéa–Samsic	+ 3' 43"
6	Jack Haig (AUS)	Team Bahrain Victorious	+ 3' 51"
7	Ion Izagirre (ESP)	Cofidis	+ 4' 52"
8	João Almeida (POR)	UAE Team Emirates	+ 5' 43"
9	Guillaume Martin (FRA)	Cofidis	+ 5' 48"
10	Aurélien Paret-Peintre (FRA)	AG2R Citroën Team	+ 6' 32"

=== Points classification ===
Final points classification (1–10)
Rank	Rider	Team	Points
1	Wout van Aert (BEL)	Team Jumbo–Visma	72
2	Primož Roglič (SLO)	Team Jumbo–Visma	50
3	Mads Pedersen (DEN)	Trek–Segafredo	44
4	Simon Yates (GBR)	Team BikeExchange–Jayco	33
5	Brandon McNulty (USA)	UAE Team Emirates	31
6	Mathieu Burgaudeau (FRA)	Team TotalEnergies	18
7	Pierre Latour (FRA)	Team TotalEnergies	16
8	Franck Bonnamour (FRA)	B&B Hotels–KTM	16
9	Daniel Martínez (COL)	INEOS Grenadiers	15
10	Stefan Küng (SUI)	Groupama–FDJ	12

=== Mountains classification ===
Final mountains classification (1–10)
Rank	Rider	Team	Points
1	Valentin Madouas (FRA)	Groupama–FDJ	44
2	Wout van Aert (BEL)	Team Jumbo–Visma	24
3	Primož Roglič (SLO)	Team Jumbo–Visma	22
4	Simon Yates (GBR)	Team BikeExchange–Jayco	14
5	Quentin Pacher (FRA)	Groupama–FDJ	13
6	Brandon McNulty (USA)	UAE Team Emirates	12
7	Daniel Martínez (COL)	INEOS Grenadiers	11
8	Victor Koretzky (FRA)	B&B Hotels–KTM	9
9	Owain Doull (GBR)	EF Education–EasyPost	7
10	Mathieu Burgaudeau (FRA)	Team TotalEnergies	6

=== Young rider classification ===
Final young rider classification (1–10)
Rank	Rider	Team	Time
1	João Almeida (POR)	UAE Team Emirates	29h 24' 58"
2	Andreas Leknessund (NOR)	Team DSM	+ 2' 30"
3	Brandon McNulty (USA)	UAE Team Emirates	+ 4' 22"
4	Mauri Vansevenant (BEL)	Quick-Step Alpha Vinyl Team	+ 17' 08"
5	Georg Zimmermann (GER)	Intermarché–Wanty–Gobert Matériaux	+ 20' 45"
6	Fred Wright (GBR)	Team Bahrain Victorious	+ 28' 09"
7	Mathieu Burgaudeau (FRA)	Team TotalEnergies	+ 30' 05"
8	Finn Fisher-Black (NZL)	UAE Team Emirates	+ 41' 50"
9	Ethan Hayter (GBR)	INEOS Grenadiers	+ 52' 57"
10	Tobias Bayer (AUT)	Alpecin–Fenix	+ 1h 02' 59"

=== Team classification ===
Final team classification (1–10)
Rank	Team	Time
1	UAE Team Emirates	88h 19' 56"
2	INEOS Grenadiers	+ 7' 32"
3	Team Jumbo–Visma	+ 13' 10"
4	Team Bahrain Victorious	+ 20' 33"
5	Trek–Segafredo	+ 37' 31"
6	Team TotalEnergies	+ 38' 40"
7	Movistar Team	+ 44' 16"
8	Arkéa–Samsic	+ 49' 51"
9	Team DSM	+ 50' 24"
10	Groupama–FDJ	+ 53' 50"

== Notes ==
^{a} As of 1 March 2022, the UCI announced that cyclists from Russia and Belarus would no longer compete under the name or flag of those respective countries due to the Russian invasion of Ukraine.
