= Francisco Palacios =

Francisco Palacios may refer to:

- Francisco de Palacios (1623–1652), Spanish Baroque painter
- Francisco Palacios (boxer) (born 1977), Puerto Rican boxer
- Francisco Palacios (footballer) (born 1990), Panamanian football defender
- Francisco Palacios Miranda (fl. 1840s), Mexican governor of Baja California from 1844 to 1847
