= José Antonio de Segovia =

Spanish bicycle racer

Personal information
- Full name: José Antonio de Segovia Botella
- Born: 23 October 1982 (age 43) Las Navas del Marqués, Spain
- Height: 1.87 m (6 ft 2 in)
- Weight: 75 kg (165 lb)

Cycling career
- Sport: Cycling
- Current team: Retired
- Discipline: Road
- Role: Rider

Professional teams
- 2010: Xacobeo–Galicia
- 2015–2016: Louletano–Ray Just Energy

José Antonio de Segovia Botella (born 23 October 1982 in Las Navas del Marqués) is a Spanish former road racing cyclist.

== Major results ==
2009
1st Overall Vuelta a Extremadura

1st Stage 1

8th Overall Vuelta a la Comunidad de Madrid
2013
6th Overall Vuelta Ciclista a León

1st Stage 2

2015
8th Clássica Loulé
2016
9th Overall Troféu Joaquim Agostinho
