= Raúl García de Mateos =

Spanish bicycle racer

Personal information
- Full name: Raúl García de Mateos Rubio
- Born: 5 July 1982 (age 44) Manzanares, Ciudad Real, Spain

Cycling career
- Sport: Cycling
- Current team: Aluminios Cortizo–CC Padronés
- Discipline: Road
- Role: Rider

Amateur teams
- 2004: FC Barcelona–Excellent Center
- 2008: Super Froiz
- 2010–2013: Super Froiz
- 2017–: Cortizo–Anova

Professional teams
- 2005–2007: Relax–Fuenlabrada
- 2009: Andorra–Grandvalira
- 2013–2014: Louletano–Dunas Douradas
- 2017: Louletano–Hospital de Loulé

Raúl García de Mateos Rubio (born 5 July 1982 in Manzanares, Ciudad Real) is a Spanish racing cyclist. His brother Vicente García de Mateos is also a racing cyclist.

== Major results ==
2004
9th Overall Volta a Lleida
2008
1st Overall Vuelta a Toledo
1st Stage 4 Tour of Galicia
9th Overall Vuelta a Extremadura
10th Overall Circuito Montañes
2009
5th Overall Cinturó de l'Empordà
2010
1st Overall Tour of Galicia
1st Stage 3 Vuelta a Ávila
1st Stage 4 Vuelta a Zamora
2011
8th Overall Vuelta Ciclista a León
2012
1st Road race, National Amateur Road Championships
9th Overall Vuelta Ciclista a León
2013
1st Trofeo Iberdrola
2018
1st Overall Vuelta a Salamanca
1st Clásica de Pascua
2019
1st Overall Volta a Coruña

1st Stage 1

3rd Overall Tour of Galicia
