= Martí Márquez =

Spanish cyclist

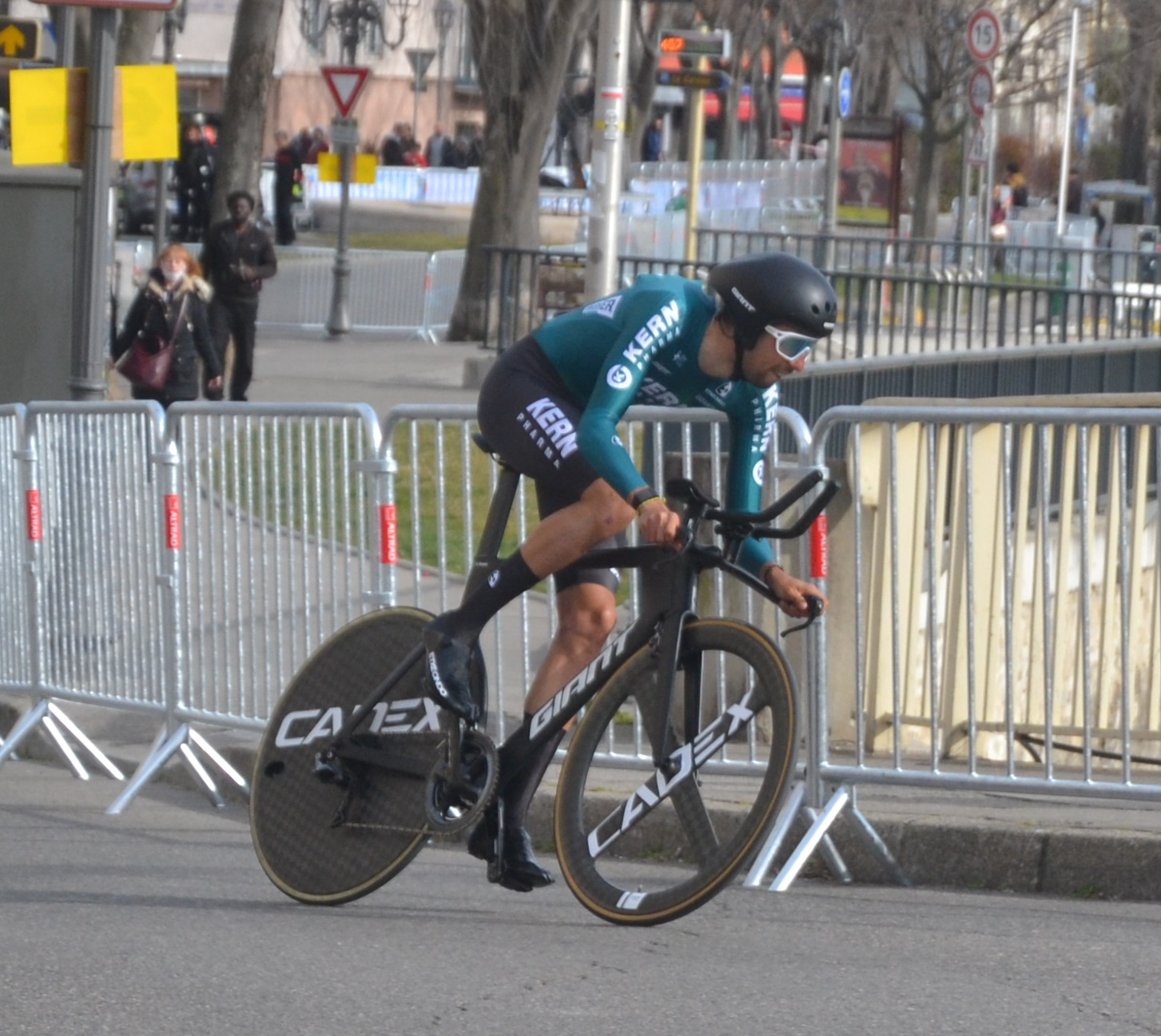
- Márquez in 2022

Personal information
- Born: 9 February 1996 (age 30) Llinars del Vallès, Spain
- Height: 1.84 m (6 ft 0 in)
- Weight: 66 kg (146 lb)

Cycling career
- Sport: Cycling
- Current team: Equipo Kern Pharma
- Discipline: Road
- Role: Rider

Amateur team
- 2015–2019: Lizarte

Professional team
- 2020–: Equipo Kern Pharma

Martí Márquez Román (born 9 February 1996) is a Spanish cyclist, who currently rides for UCI ProTeam Equipo Kern Pharma.

== Major results ==
2019
1st Overall Tour of Galicia

1st Stage 1 (TTT)

3rd Overall Vuelta a Zamora

1st Stage 1 (TTT)

2020
2nd Overall Belgrade Banjaluka
8th Overall Tour de Serbie
2021
4th Overall Tour de la Mirabelle
