= Orthodox stance =

Way of positioning the feet and hands in combat sports

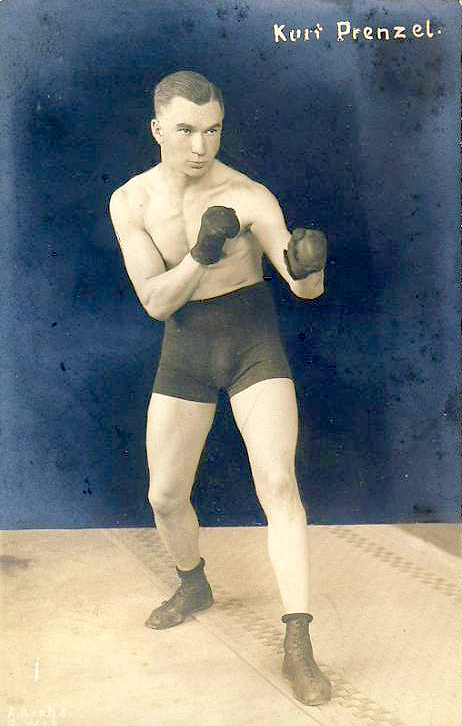
Kurt Prenzel, boxer of the 1920s, displaying orthodox stance with left hand and left foot to the fore

In combat sports such as boxing and mixed martial arts ("MMA"), an orthodox stance is one in which the fighter places their left foot in front, thus placing their left side closer to the opponent. Because it places the right side (the stronger side for most people) in the rear, the orthodox stance can allow for more rotation and distance to accelerate right-sided strikes, in turn generating more power. This makes it the most common stance in boxing, as well as MMA, and primarily used by right-handed fighters.

== Usage ==
Orthodox stance is the most common stance in boxing and MMA for its superior power generation by right-handed fighters. However, the stance also finds usage from some left-handed fighters, too, owing to some of the advantages it has in general, as well as for the left-handed in particular.

=== General advantages ===
The orthodox stance has two major advantages for all practitioners: its ubiquity and its placement of the lead hand and foot closer to the right side of the opponent. Since it is the most common stance, high quality training in the stance is more widely available. Furthermore, most of the opponents any fighter trains with will use orthodox, building greater familiarity with the stance.

Additionally, because the left side is forward, the left hand and foot are quite close to the opponent's right side. This is particularly useful as the liver is a highly vulnerable target; various fighters such as Stipe Miocic have KO'd other fighters through liver shots.

=== Advantages for right-handers ===
Placing the right hand in the rear allows for the most powerful punches from right-handed fighters. Since the more powerful right side is in the rear, there is more time and rotation of the body between launching the punch and impact, allowing for more power generation.

=== Advantages for left-handers ===
For left-handed fighters, the orthodox stance provides the benefit of placing the more powerful hand in the front. This provides more power to the quicker punches of the lead hand, such as the jab and lead hook.

== MMA considerations ==
The same power advantages of punches described above also apply to kicks for the respective dominant sides. Further, for right-side dominant fighters, having the stronger foot in the rear allows for more stability when defending takedown attempts.

== Statistical advantage ==
Statistically, orthodox fighters are not more likely than other fighters to win, but regardless of their stance, fighters are more likely to beat orthodox opponents.

== Examples ==
=== Right-handed orthodox fighters ===
Since the orthodox stance is so common, especially as pertains to right-handed individuals, there is a quite extensive list of prominent right-handed orthodox fighters. Some of the most famous include Muhammad Ali, Floyd Mayweather, Sugar Ray Robinson, and Khabib Nurmagomedov.

=== Left-handed orthodox fighters ===
While this stance is predominantly associated with right-handed fighters, there is a notable contingent of left-handed orthodox fighters, including such prominent figures as Mike Tyson, Oscar De La Hoya, Sonny Liston, Miguel Angel Cotto, Gerry Cooney, Sean Strickland, Michael Bisping, Renan Barao, and Marco Antonio Barrera.

== Alternative stances ==
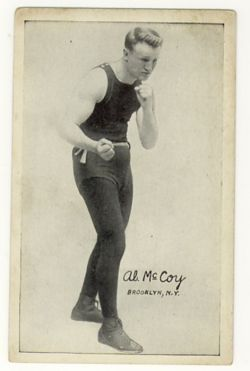
American boxer Al McCoy standing in the southpaw stance

The opposite stance to orthodox is southpaw. It is a mirror image of the orthodox stance. A southpaw fighter stands with their right foot forward, with their left side further from the opponent. Some famous boxers who use the southpaw stance are Marvelous Marvin Hagler, Victor Ortiz, Sultan Ibragimov, Naseem Hamed, Joe Calzaghe, Manny Pacquiao, and Lucian Bute. Famous MMA southpaws include Nick and Nate Diaz, Conor McGregor and Anderson Silva.

Many fighters such as Francisco Palacios, Andre Ward, Jon Jones, and Terence Crawford normally fight as orthodox, but occasionally switch to a southpaw stance. Hagler was the opposite, normally fighting southpaw but sometimes switching to orthodox.

While southpaw is generally associated with left-handed fighters, there are some right-handed individuals who favor the stance over orthodox, such as Vasiliy Lomachenko, Oleksandr Usyk, Shakur Stevenson, and Nate Diaz.
