= Francisco Palacios (boxer) =

Puerto Rican boxer

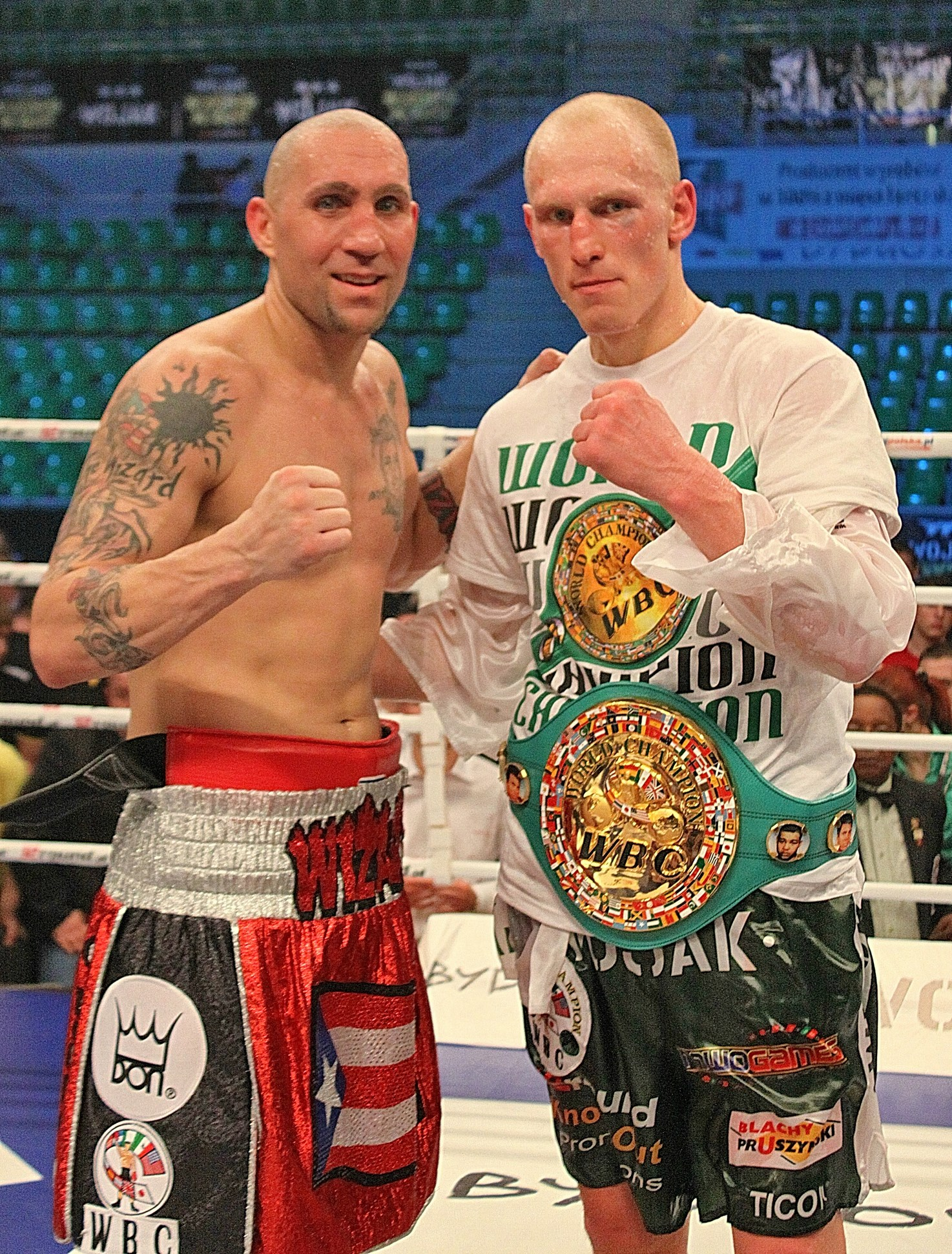
- F. Palacios & K. Włodarczyk

Personal information
- Nickname: Wizard
- Nationality: Puerto Rican
- Born: Francisco Palacios; May 25, 1977 (age 49) New York City, New York, U.S.
- Height: 6 ft 2 in (1.88 m)
- Weight: Cruiserweight

Boxing career
- Stance: Orthodox

Boxing record
- Total fights: 28
- Wins: 24
- Win by KO: 15
- Losses: 4 (2KO)

Francisco Palacios (born 25 May 1977) is a Puerto Rican professional boxer who challenged for the WBC cruiserweight title in 2011.

== Personal life ==
Palacios was born in the Bronx, New York but moved to Bayamon, Puerto Rico, at the age of 3. Before he took up boxing, Palacios played college basketball on a scholarship at North Carolina Central University.

== Amateur career ==
From 2000 to 2004 Palacios fought as an amateur boxer and had 70 matches.

== Professional career ==
On April 2, 2011, Palacios fought in Bydgoszcz against Krzysztof Włodarczyk. Palacios fought for the WBC cruiserweight title, but he lost by split decision after a 12-rounded bout. Scorecards were 115–113, 113-116 and 112–118.

In his fight in September 2012, he again lost to Włodarczyk, by unanimous decision.

== Professional boxing record ==
28 fights	24 wins	4 losses
By knockout	15	2
By decision	9	2

Result	Record	Opponent	Type	Round, time	Date	Location	Notes
Win	24–4	(Argentina) Mariano Jose Riva	TKO	1 (6)	2019-10-25	(United States) Fair Expo Center, Miami, USA	
Loss	23–4	(Poland) Michał Cieślak	TKO	4 (10)	2016-04-02	Tauron Arena (previously Krakow Arena), Krakow, Poland	
Loss	23–3	(Russia) Dmitry Kudryashov	KO	1 (10)	2015-04-10	Luzhniki, Moscow, Russia	For WBA International Cruiserweight Title
Win	23–2	(Dominican Republic) Sandy Soto	KO	1 (8)	2015-02-07	Casa de los Clubes, Santo Domingo, Dominican Republic	
Win	22–2	(Colombia) Epifanio Mendoza	UD	8	2014-09-20	(United States) The Mela Room, Orlando, USA	
Loss	21–2	(Poland) Krzysztof Wlodarczyk	UD	12	2012-09-22	Hala Stulecia, Wroclaw, Poland	For WBC World Cruiserweight Title.
