= Sergio Rodríguez (cyclist) =

Spanish cyclist

Personal information
- Full name: Sergio Rodríguez Reche
- Born: 22 February 1992 (age 34) Pamplona, Spain
- Height: 1.8 m (5 ft 11 in)
- Weight: 70 kg (154 lb)

Cycling career
- Sport: Cycling
- Current team: Retired
- Discipline: Road
- Role: Rider

Amateur teams
- 2012–2013: Seguros Bilbao
- 2014: Gipuzkoa–Oreki
- 2015: Caja Rural–Seguros RGA amateur
- 2016: Infisport–Alavanet
- 2017: Fundación Euskadi–EDP

Professional teams
- 2017: Equipo Bolivia
- 2018–2019: Euskadi–Murias
- 2021: Team Illuminate

Sergio Rodríguez Reche (born 22 February 1992) is a Spanish former cyclist, who competed as a professional from 2017 to 2021.
