= Daniel Van de Wiele =

Belgian boxing referee

Daniel Van de Wiele (born November 10, 1956, in Leuven, Belgium), is a boxing referee, most notable for his refereeing of the WBC heavyweight title fight between Lennox Lewis and Hasim Rahman on April 21, 2001. He has also refereed the 2009 the WBC heavyweight title fight between Vitaly Klitschko and Juan Carlos Gómez, which ended in the ninth round with Gómez unable to continue.

== Work as referee ==
Van de Wiele started his work as a boxing referee on December 13, 1980. Since then, Daniel Van de Wiele has refereed over 900 title fights. His most notable fights refereeing include the 2001 WBC Heavyweight title and the 2009 WBC Heavyweight title.

== Personal ==
Daniel Van de Wiele is married to Olena Pobyvailo. They have a daughter, Sophie, and Daniel has 2 children from a first marriage, Koen and Dorien.
