= Firat Arslan =

German boxer (born 1970)

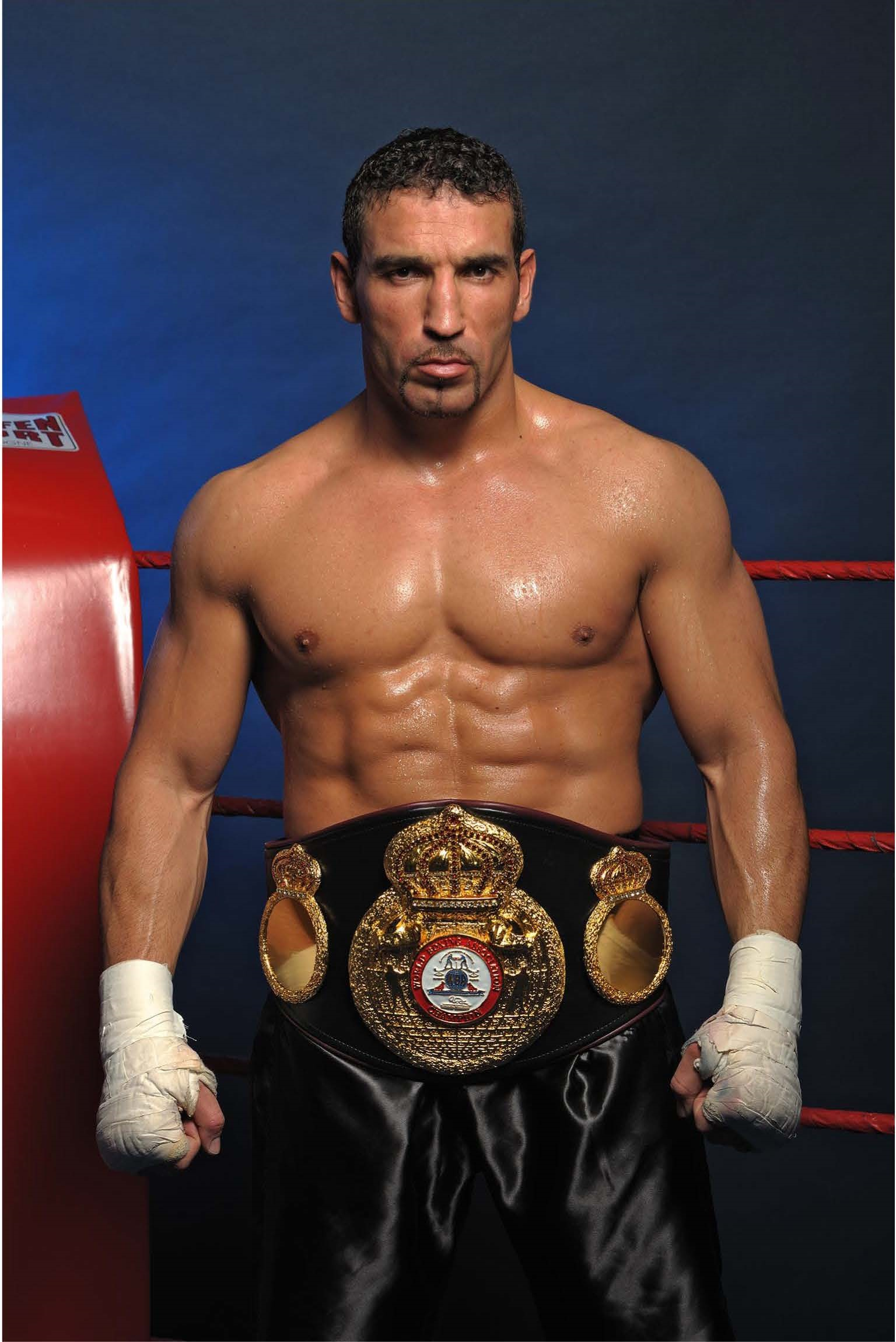

Personal information
- Nationality: German; Turkish
- Born: 28 September 1970 (age 55) Friedberg, Bavaria, West Germany
- Height: 182 cm (6 ft 0 in)
- Weight: Cruiserweight

Boxing career
- Reach: 195 cm (77 in)
- Stance: Southpaw

Boxing record
- Total fights: 69
- Wins: 57
- Win by KO: 42
- Losses: 9
- Draws: 3

Firat Arslan (born 28 September 1970) is a German professional boxer. He held the World Boxing Association (WBA) cruiserweight title from 2007 to 2008. At regional level, he has held multiple cruiserweight championships, including the German title from 2004 to 2005.

== Professional career ==
Southpaw Arslan began his professional career in 1997 and won his first 13 fights with before dropping back to back decisions to Collice Mutizwa and Rüdiger May.

In July 2007 he captured the interim WBA cruiserweight title with a split decision win over yet another Russian in Valery Brudov. Later that year he bested 43-year-old Virgil Hill for the WBA title. He beat contender Darnell Wilson on 3 May 2008 in Germany by unanimous decision.

He lost his title against Panamanian Guillermo Jones in Hamburg, on 27 September 2008, one day before his birthday. After the loss to Jones, Arslan took an extended leave from boxing and returned almost two years later to face unheralded Steve Hérélius for the interim title. Arslan was in front but at the end of the 11th round he was unable to continue because of a syncope.

In 2014, Arslan fought Yoan Pablo Hernandez for a chance to take Hernandez's cruiserweight belt, but lost by split decision with scores of: 115–113, 116–113 and 113–115.

== Professional boxing record ==
| 69 fights | 57 wins | 9 losses |
|---|---|---|
| By knockout | 42 | 4 |
| By decision | 15 | 5 |
| Draws | 3 | |

| No. | Result | Record | Opponent | Type | Round, time | Date | Location | Notes |
|---|---|---|---|---|---|---|---|---|
| 69 | Win | 57–9–3 | Hamisi Maya | TKO | 1 (10), 1:49 | 2025-10-07 | Wiesbaden, Hessen, Germany | |
| 68 | Win | 56–9–3 | Angel Gabriel Ledesma | KO | 2 (10) | 2024-10-12 | Firat Arslan Sportcenter, Goeppingen, Germany | |
| 67 | Win | 55–9–3 | Edin Puhalo | TKO | 6 (12) | 2023-10-21 | EWS Arena, Goeppingen, Germany | Won WBA Gold cruiserweight title |
| 66 | Win | 54–9–3 | Ibrahim Yildirim | KO | 1 (10) | 2023-05-27 | Helios Arena, Villingen-Schwenningen, Germany | |
| 65 | Win | 53–9–3 | Jackson dos Santos | TKO | 2 (10) | 2022-12-17 | Firat Arslan Sportcenter, Goeppingen, Germany | |
| 64 | Win | 52–9–3 | Juan Rodolfo Juarez | TKO | 2 (10) | 2022-07-15 | Historische Stadthalle, Wuppertal, Germany | |
| 63 | Win | 51–9–3 | Toni Thes | TKO | 2 (10) | 2022-03-26 | Firat Arslan Sportcenter, Goeppingen, Germany | |
| 62 | Win | 50–9–3 | Alejandro Berrio | KO | 4 (12), 2:40 | 2021-12-04 | Sartory-Saal, Cologne, Germany | Retained WBA International cruiserweight titles |
| 61 | Win | 49–9–3 | Ruben Eduardo Acosta | TKO | 4 (12), 2:56 | 2021-07-24 | Firat Arslan Sportcenter, Baden-Würrtemburg, Germany | Won vacant WBA International cruiserweight title |
| 60 | Win | 48–9–3 | Gusmyr Pedromo | KO | 3 (10), 0:45 | 2021-03-06 | Firat Arslan Sportcenter, Baden-Württemburg, Germany | |
| 59 | Loss | 47–9–3 | Kevin Lerena | TKO | 6 (12), 1:13 | 2020-02-08 | EWS Arena, Baden-Württemburg, Germany | For IBO cruiserweight title |
| 58 | Win | 47–8–3 | Sami Enbom | KO | 3 (10), 0:30 | 2019-09-14 | Verti Music Hall, Berlin, Germany | |
| 57 | Win | 46–8–3 | Cesar David Crenz | KO | 2 (10), 0:30 | 2019-06-22 | Germany | |
| 56 | Win | 45–8–3 | Ricardo Marcelo Ramallo | TKO | 3 (12), 0:47 | 2019-04-13 | Ülker Spor Arena, Istanbul, Turkey | Retained GBU cruiserweight title |
| 55 | Draw | 44–8–3 | Sefer Seferi | MD | 12 | 2018-11-17 | Goeppingen, Baden-Württemberg, Germany | Retained GBU cruiserweight title |
| 54 | Win | 44–8–2 | Pascal Ndomba | KO | 2 (12), 1:55 | 2018-09-22 | Istanbul, Turkey | Retained GBU cruiserweight title |
| 53 | Win | 43–8–2 | Pablo Matias Magrini | KO | 1 (12), 1:55 | 2018-06-16 | Wildparkstadion, Karlsruhe, Germany | Won GBU cruiserweight title |
| 52 | Win | 42–8–2 | Isaac Paa Kwesi Ankrah | KO | 1 (10), 2:45 | 2018-05-19 | Spor Salonu, Trabzon, Turkey | Won vacant WBO Inter-Continental cruiserweight title |
| 51 | Win | 41–8–2 | Alejandro Emilio Valori | KO | 7 (10), | 2017-10-07 | EWS Arena, Baden-Württemberg, Germany | |
| 50 | Win | 40–8–2 | Goran Delic | TKO | 6 (12), 2:02 | 2017-07-15 | EWS Arena, Göppingen, Germany | Won vacant WBO European cruiserweight title |
| 49 | Win | 39–8–2 | Gezim Tahiri | RTD | 2 (10), 3:00 | 2017-03-18 | Silence Hotel, Istanbul, Turkey | |
| 48 | Win | 38–8–2 | Nuri Seferi | UD | 12 | 2016-09-17 | Göppingen, Germany | Won vacant WBO European cruiserweight title |
| 47 | Win | 37–8–2 | Claudio Morroni Porto | KO | 1 (8), 2:35 | 2016-06-04 | Autohaus Duerkop, Kassel, Hessen, Germany | |
| 46 | Win | 36–8–2 | Paata Aduashvili | KO | 2 (12), 2:33 | 2015-11-07 | MHP Arena, Ludwigsburg, Germany | |
| 45 | Win | 35–8–2 | Gyula Bozai | UD | 8 | 2015-05-02 | ASV Halle, Dachau, Bayern, Germany | |
| 44 | Loss | 34–8–2 | Yoan Pablo Hernandez | SD | 12 | 2014-08-16 | Messehalle, Erfurt, Thüringen, Germany | For IBF and The Ring cruiserweight titles |
| 43 | Win | 34–7–2 | Tamas Bajzath | UD | 8 | 2014-06-07 | Sport and Congress Center, Schwerin, Germany | |
| 42 | Loss | 33–7–2 | Marco Huck | TKO | 6 (12), 1:56 | 2014-01-25 | Hanns-Martin-Schleyer Halle, Stuttgart, Germany | For WBO cruiserweight title |
| 41 | Win | 33–6–2 | Varol Vekiloglu | UD | 10 | 2013-04-27 | Sporthalle, Alsterdorf, Hamburg, Germany | |
| 40 | Loss | 32–6–2 | Marco Huck | UD | 12 | 2012-11-03 | Gerry Weber Stadium, Halle, Germany | For WBO cruiserweight title |
| 39 | Draw | 32–5–2 | Aleksandr Alekseyev | MD | 12 | 2012-05-11 | EWS Arena, Baden-Württemberg, Germany | For European cruiserweight title |
| 38 | Win | 32–5–1 | Orlando Antonio Farias | TKO | 2 (10), 2:18 | 2012-01-28 | Grand Elysée, Rotherbaum, Hamburg, Germany | |
| 37 | Win | 31–5–1 | Lubos Suda | TKO | 5 (12), 2:41 | 2011-07-15 | EWS Arena, Baden-Württemberg, Germany | Won vacant PABA and IBF International cruiserweight titles |
| 36 | Win | 30–5–1 | Michal Bilak | TKO | 3 (8), 2:39 | 2011-04-01 | Digibet Pferdesportpark, Berlin, Germany | |
| 35 | Loss | 29–5–1 | Steve Herelius | RTD | 11 (12), 3:00 | 2010-07-03 | Porsche-Arena, Stuttgart, Germany | For WBA interim cruiserweight title |
| 34 | Loss | 29–4–1 | Guillermo Jones | TKO | 10 (12), 2:33 | 2008-09-27 | Color Line Arena, Hamburg, Germany | Lost WBA cruiserweight title |
| 33 | Win | 29–3–1 | Darnell Wilson | UD | 12 | 2008-05-03 | Hanns-Martin-Schleyer-Halle, Stuttgart, Germany | Retained WBA (Regular) cruiserweight title |
| 32 | Win | 28–3–1 | Virgil Hill | UD | 12 | 2007-11-24 | Freiberger Arena, Dresden, Germany | Won WBA (Regular) cruiserweight title |
| 31 | Win | 27–3–1 | Valery Brudov | SD | 12 | 2007-06-16 | SYMA Sports Centre, Budapest, Hungary | Won WBA interim cruiserweight title |
| 30 | Win | 26–3–1 | Grigory Drozd | TKO | 5 (12) | 2006-10-28 | Porsche-Arena, Stuttgart, Germany | |
| 29 | Win | 25–3–1 | Gabor Halasz | TKO | 2 (12) | 2006-05-23 | Sportna Dvoran Center, Ptuj, Slovenia | Retained WBO Inter-Continental cruiserweight title |
| 28 | Win | 24–3–1 | Carlos Cruzat | UD | 12 | 2005-11-15 | Hohenstaufenhalle, Goeppingen, Germany | Won WBO Inter-Continental cruiserweight title |
| 27 | Win | 23–3–1 | Wlodek Kopec | KO | 1 (8), 1:35 | 2005-05-28 | Hanns-Martin-Schleyer-Halle, Stuttgart, Germany | |
| 26 | Win | 22–3–1 | Alexander Petkovic | TKO | 7 (12) | 2005-01-18 | Kugelbake-Halle, Cuxhaven, Germany | Won vacant WBO Inter-Continental cruiserweight title |
| 25 | Win | 21–3–1 | Lee Manuel Ossie | UD | 10 | 2004-07-31 | Hanns-Martin-Schleyer-Halle, Stuttgart, Germany | Won vacant EBU-EU (European Union) cruiserweight title |
| 24 | Win | 20–3–1 | Marco Heinichen | KO | 5 (10) | 2004-03-20 | Maritim Hotel, Cologne, Germany | Won vacant BDB German cruiserweight title |
| 23 | Win | 19–3–1 | Mircea Telecan | TKO | 2 (6) | 2004-01-17 | Rhein-Mosel-Halle, Koblenz, Germany | |
| 22 | Loss | 18–3–1 | Lubos Suda | UD | 12 | 2003-12-12 | Hotel Hilton, Prague, Czech Republic | |
| 21 | Draw | 18–2–1 | Vadim Tokarev | PTS | 12 | 2003-08-16 | Nuerburgring, Nuerburg, Germany | For IBF Inter-Continental cruiserweight title |
| 20 | Win | 18–2 | Bruce Oezbek | UD | 10 | 2003-05-24 | Neuwieder Heimathaus, Neuwied, Germany | Won vacant BDB International cruiserweight title |
| 19 | Win | 17–2 | Mircea Telecan | TKO | 2 (6) | 2002-09-07 | Neuwieder Heimathaus, Neuwied, Germany | |
| 18 | Win | 16–2 | Cosmin Pocora | KO | 1 (4) | 2002-06-15 | Kandel, Germany | |
| 17 | Win | 15–2 | Mihai Iftode | PTS | 4 (4) | 2002-06-08 | Fernwaldhalle, Giessen, Germany | |
| 16 | Win | 14–2 | Mark Hobson | TKO | 7 (8) | 2001-10-08 | Metrodome, Barnsley, England, U.K. | |
| 15 | Loss | 13–2 | Rüdiger May | UD | 10 | 2001-05-19 | Maritim Hotel, Cologne, Germany | For BDB German cruiserweight title |
| 14 | Loss | 13–1 | Collice Mutizwa | PTS | 6 | 2000-12-08 | National Sports Centre, Crystal Palace, England, U.K. | |
| 13 | Win | 13–0 | Tony Booth | TKO | 2 (6) | 2000-10-31 | Novotel Hotel, Hammersmith, England, U.K. | |
| 12 | Win | 12–0 | Chris Woollas | TKO | 2 (8) | 2000-07-13 | York Hall, Bethnal Green, England, U.K. | |
| 11 | Win | 11–0 | Yves Monsieur | KO | 2 (8) | 2000-05-27 | Koblenz, Germany | |
| 10 | Win | 10–0 | Zoltan Petranyi | KO | 3 (6) | 1999-10-16 | Rhein-Mosel-Halle, Koblenz, Germany | |
| 9 | Win | 9–0 | Zoltan Beres | PTS | 8 | 1999-08-21 | Dresden, Germany | |
| 8 | Win | 8–0 | Frantisek Pacalaj | TKO | 2 (6) | 1999-06-19 | Vienna, Austria | |
| 7 | Win | 7–0 | Zoltan Kovacs | KO | 1 (6) | 1999-03-27 | Dresden, Germany | |
| 6 | Win | 6–0 | Wesly Dramasky | KO | 2 (6) | 1998-11-14 | Koblenz, Germany | |
| 5 | Win | 5–0 | Patrik Akerlund | SD | 6 (6) | 1998-07-22 | Outrup Speedwaybane, Outrup, Denmark | |
| 4 | Win | 4–0 | Ladislav Olah | TKO | 2 (6) | 1998-04-21 | Leganes, Spain | |
| 3 | Win | 3–0 | Roman Nikodem | KO | 2 (6) | 1997-11-29 | Ingelmunster, Belgium | |
| 2 | Win | 2–0 | Kevin Mitchell | PTS | 4 (4) | 1997-09-02 | Elephant & Castle Centre, Southwark, England, U.K. | |
| 1 | Win | 1–0 | Zsolt Janko | PTS | 4 (4) | 1997-01-25 | Maritim Hotel, Stuttgart, Germany | |

== See also ==
- List of southpaw stance boxers
- List of world cruiserweight boxing champions

Sporting positions
Regional boxing titles
| Vacant Title last held by Alexander Petkovic | Bund Deutscher Berufsboxer; International cruiserweight champion May 24, 2003 – 2004; Vacated | Vacant Title next held by Mark Hendem |
| Vacant Title last held by Rüdiger May | Bund Deutscher Berufsboxer; German cruiserweight champion March 20, 2004 – 2005; Vacated | Vacant Title next held by Ali Saidi |
| Vacant Title last held by Rüdiger May | EBU European Union cruiserweight champion July 31, 2004 – 2005; Vacated | Vacant Title next held by Krzysztof Włodarczyk |
| Vacant Title last held by Thomas Hansvoll | WBO Inter-Continental cruiserweight champion January 18, 2005 – June, 2007; Vacated | Vacant Title next held by Aleksandr Alekseyev |
| Vacant Title last held by Giulian Ilie | IBF International cruiserweight champion July 15, 2011 – 2012; Vacated | Vacant Title next held by Varol Vekiloglu |
| Vacant Title last held by Ali Ismayilov | PABA cruiserweight champion July 15, 2011 – 2012; Vacated | Vacant Title next held by Andrei Kniazev |
| Vacant Title last held by Damir Beljo | WBO European cruiserweight champion September 17, 2016 – 2016; Vacated | Vacant Title next held by Mario Daser |
| Vacant Title last held by Mario Daser | WBO European cruiserweight champion July 15, 2017 – 2016; Vacated | Vacant Title next held by Mateusz Masternak |
| Vacant Title last held by Imre Szellő | WBO Inter-Continental cruiserweight champion May 19, 2018 – 2019; Vacated | Vacant Title next held by Evgeny Tishchenko |
| Vacant Title last held by Kamshybek Kunkabayev | WBA Gold cruiserweight champion October 21, 2023 – 2024; Vacated | Vacant |
Minor World boxing titles
| Vacant Title last held by Agron Dzila | GBU cruiserweight champion June 16, 2018 – 2020; Vacated | Vacant Title next held by Armend Xhoxhaj |
Major World boxing titles
| Preceded by Valery Brudov | WBA cruiserweight champion Interim title June 16, 2007 – November 24, 2007; Won regular title | Vacant Title next held by Steve Hérélius |
| Preceded by Virgil Hill | WBA cruiserweight champion Regular title November 24, 2007 – June 19, 2008; Status changed | Vacant Title next held by Beibut Shumenov |
| Preceded by David Haye as Unified champion | WBA cruiserweight champion June 19, 2008 – September 27, 2008 | Succeeded by Guillermo Jones |
