= Guillermo Jones =

Panamanian boxer (born 1972)

Personal information
- Nicknames: El Felino; El Jefe
- Born: Guillermo Agustin Jones; May 5, 1972 (age 54) Colón, Panama
- Height: 6 ft 4 in (193 cm)
- Weight: Welterweight; Light middleweight; Cruiserweight; Heavyweight

Boxing career
- Reach: 76 in (193 cm)
- Stance: Orthodox

Boxing record
- Total fights: 47
- Wins: 41
- Win by KO: 31
- Losses: 3
- Draws: 2
- No contests: 1

Guillermo Jones (born May 5, 1972) is a Panamanian former professional boxer who competed from 1993 to 2017. He held the WBA cruiserweight title from 2008 to 2012, and challenged twice for the WBA super welterweight title in 1998.

== Professional career ==
Jones made his professional debut in 1993 as a welterweight, and was a world champion as a cruiserweight 20 years later in 2013 He won his first 21 bouts in Panama, but was then stopped in Venezuela in two rounds by David Noel of Trinidad and Tobago in September 1997. He avenged that loss two months later in Panama by first round Knockout. Now aligned with promoter Don King, Jones fought two light middleweight WBA world title bouts against Laurent Boudouani in 1998. He drew once and lost the rematch by split decision in 12 round contests.

Jones fought his way through four weight classes. Later fighting as a cruiserweight in 2002, he fought Johnny Nelson for the WBO World cruiserweight title, drawing in 12 rounds in his third world title attempt. Most in attendance thought Jones had done enough to win the title from Nelson.

After yet another split decision loss in 2005 to future cruiserweight world title holder Steve Cunningham, Jones rebounded the same year with knockouts of Kelvin Davis and Wayne Braithwaite.

Jones got a shot at WBA World Cruiserweight champion Firat Arslan on September 27, 2008 and won the WBA world title by tenth round stoppage. He was the heaviest, and the oldest professional fighter from Panama to have achieved a world championship when he became Panama's 28th world boxing champion. After winning the WBA title, Jones created controversy when he went through a two year period of inactivity while remaining WBA world champion.

In August 2010, the WBA finally threatened to strip Jones of his belt unless he defended his world title. As a result, he made his first defense of his world title against Valery Brudov in October 2010, scoring an eleventh round stoppage in Panama City.

Jones second defense of his title was scheduled to take place on June 25, 2011, against then undefeated Ryan Coyne. A few days before the fight, Jones pulled out, citing a back injury sustained following a training session. Jones later announced he would make a mandatory defense against Yoan Pablo Hernández. The fight was scheduled to take place in Germany on August 27, 2011, but the bout was cancelled with no specific reason.

Jones the defended his WBA world title against Mike Marrone. The fight took place in Florida on November 5, 2011, with Jones retaining his title via a TKO in the sixth round. After over a year of inactivity, Jones was declared the champion in recess after he backed out of a title defense against boxer Andres Taylor of Pennsylvania. Denis Lebedev of Russia won the interim WBA World title and then won the vacant WBA World title after Jones refused to fight him. After 18 months of inactivity, Jones traveled to Russia to fight Lebedev and settle matters regarding who the legitimate WBA world champion was, himself or Lebedev.

On May 17, 2013, Jones, the WBA World Cruiserweight champion 'in recess', cut and closed the left eye of Denis Lebedev in the first round. He eventually knocked out the other WBA World Cruiserweight champion 'claimant', Denis Lebedev of Russia, at 1:54 of the eleventh round to settle the issue once and for all as to who the true WBA World Cruiserweight champion was. The bout is the first WBA World title bout in which two defending champions of the same world title belt faced each other. Jones inflicted horrific punishment on Lebedev, inflicting enough damage to Lebedev's right eye to perhaps end his career for medical reasons. Observers felt the bout should have been stopped early, but the Russian Boxing Federation would not stop the bout so it would go the distance, putting Jones in the position of having to knock Lebedev out in hostile territory to keep his title.

In October 2013, Jones was stripped of his title for failing a drug test for his WBA unification fight with Lebedev, with Lebedev being reinstated as full champion. A rematch between Lebedev and Jones has concordantly been ordered by the WBA. Jones again tested positive, and was stripped of the title, however recent allegations of Russian tampering with drug testing has put this finding in doubt. In December 2013, Jones was reinstated by the WBA as Champion in Recess.

One of his trainers was María Toto.

== Professional boxing record ==
47 fights	41 wins	3 losses
By knockout	30	1
By decision	11	2
Draws	2	
No contests	1	

No.	Result	Record	Opponent	Type	Round, time	Date	Location	Notes
47	Win	41–3–2 (1)	Ytalo Perea	SD	11	Nov 18, 2017	Renaissance Hotel & Casino, Santo Domingo, Dominican Republic	Won vacant WBA Fedelatin heavyweight title
46	Win	40–3–2 (1)	Garrett Wilson	MD	6	Jul 2, 2016	Teamsters Hall, Pittsburgh, Pennsylvania, U.S.	
45	Win	39–3–2 (1)	Daniel Cota	UD	10	Nov 20, 2015	Arena Panama Al Brown, Colón, Panama	
44	NC	38–3–2 (1)	Denis Lebedev	KO	11 (12), 1:54	May 17, 2013	Crocus City Hall, Moscow, Russia	WBA cruiserweight title at stake; Originally a KO win for Jones, later ruled an NC after he failed a drug test
43	Win	38–3–2	Michael Marrone	TKO	6 (12), 1:55	Nov 5, 2011	Hard Rock Live, Hollywood, Florida, U.S.	Retained WBA cruiserweight title
42	Win	37–3–2	Valery Brudov	TKO	11 (12), 2:16	Oct 2, 2010	Roberto Durán Arena, Panama City, Panama	Retained WBA cruiserweight title
41	Win	36–3–2	Firat Arslan	TKO	10 (12), 2:33	Sep 27, 2008	Color Line Arena, Hamburg, Germany	Won WBA cruiserweight title
40	Win	35–3–2	Zack Page	UD	8	Jul 7, 2007	The Arena at Harbor Yard, Bridgeport, Connecticut, U.S.	
39	Win	34–3–2	Jeremy Bates	TKO	1 (8), 1:44	Jan 6, 2007	Hard Rock Live, Hollywood, Florida, U.S.	
38	Win	33–3–2	Wayne Braithwaite	TKO	4 (12), 2:26	Sep 3, 2005	Gund Arena, Cleveland, Ohio, U.S.	Retained WBA Fedelatin and WBC Latino cruiserweight titles
37	Win	32–3–2	Kelvin Davis	TKO	4 (10), 0:42	May 21, 2005	United Center, Chicago, Illinois, U.S.	
36	Loss	31–3–2	Steve Cunningham	SD	10	Apr 2, 2005	DCU Center, Worcester, Massachusetts, U.S.	
35	Win	31–2–2	Antonio Berroa	KO	1 (12), 2:09	Dec 3, 2004	Figali Convention Center, Panama City, Panama	Retained WBA Fedelatin cruiserweight title; Won vacant WBC Latino cruiserweight title
34	Win	30–2–2	Luciano Torres	TKO	1 (12), 1:48	Mar 16, 2004	Atlapa Convention Centre, Panama City, Panama	Won vacant WBA Fedelatin cruiserweight title
33	Draw	29–2–2	Johnny Nelson	SD	12	Nov 23, 2002	Storm Arena, Derby, England	For WBO cruiserweight title
32	Win	29–2–1	Sione Asipeli	UD	10	Jul 13, 2002	Packard Music Hall, Warren, Ohio, U.S.	
31	Win	28–2–1	Tim Williamson	SD	10	Apr 13, 2002	Fremont Street Experience, Las Vegas, Nevada, U.S.	
30	Win	27–2–1	Victor Maciel	TKO	1 (10), 1:21	May 19, 2001	Arena Panama Al Brown, Colón, Panama	
29	Win	26–2–1	Allen Watts	UD	10	May 20, 2000	Grand Casino, Tunica, Mississippi, U.S.	
28	Win	25–2–1	Jaffa Ballogou	UD	6	Dec 18, 1999	Grand Casino, Tunica, Mississippi, U.S.	
27	Win	24–2–1	Jose Maquina Rojas	TKO	2 (10), 2:59	Oct 9, 1999	Magnum Eventus, Panama City, Panama	
26	Win	23–2–1	Santos Daniels	TKO	6 (10), 1:47	Sep 4, 1999	Balboa Civic Center, Panama City, Panama	
25	Loss	22–2–1	Laurent Boudouani	SD	12	May 30, 1998	Las Vegas Hilton, Winchester, Nevada, U.S.	For WBA super welterweight title
24	Draw	22–1–1	Laurent Boudouani	MD	12	Feb 13, 1998	The Pit, Albuquerque, New Mexico, U.S.	For WBA super welterweight title
23	Win	22–1	David Noel	TKO	1 (12), 1:05	Nov 29, 1997	Arena Panama Al Brown, Colón, Panama	Retained WBA Fedelatin super welterweight title
22	Loss	21–1	David Noel	KO	2 (12)	Sep 27, 1997	Gimnasio José Beracasa, Caracas, Venezuela	Retained WBA Fedelatin super welterweight title
21	Win	21–0	Alejandro Ugueto	TKO	5 (12), 1:42	May 3, 1997	Arena Panama Al Brown, Colón, Panama	Retained WBA Fedelatin super welterweight title
20	Win	20–0	Jorge Luis Vado	KO	1 (10)	Feb 28, 1997	Colón, Panama	
19	Win	19–0	Alejandro Ugueto	PTS	12	Oct 7, 1996	Maracay, Venezuela	Retained WBA Fedelatin super welterweight title
18	Win	18–0	Gilberto Barreto	KO	1 (12), 1:04	Jun 15, 1996	Gimnasio Nuevo Panama, Panama City, Panama	Won vacant WBA Fedelatin super welterweight title
17	Win	17–0	Eduardo Rodriguez	KO	2 (10), 2:53	Apr 20, 1996	Hotel Washington, Colón, Panama	
16	Win	16–0	Manuel Florian	TKO	2 (10)	Mar 29, 1996	Hipódromo Presidente Remón, Panama City, Panama	
15	Win	15–0	Carlos Alberto Arrieta	KO	1 (12), 2:41	Mar 15, 1996	Gimnasio Nuevo Panama, Panama City, Panama	Retained WBA Fedelatin welterweight title
14	Win	14–0	José García	KO	1 (12)	Feb 2, 1996	Arena Panama Al Brown, Colón, Panama	Retained WBA Fedelatin welterweight title
13	Win	13–0	Manuel Alvarez	KO	1 (12)	Sep 18, 1995	Maracay, Venezuela	Retained WBA Fedelatin welterweight title
12	Win	12–0	Ricardo Simarra	TKO	4 (12), 1:50	Aug 5, 1995	Arena Panama Al Brown, Colón, Panama	Won vacant WBA Fedelatin welterweight title
11	Win	11–0	Antonio Ocasio	KO	3 (12), 0:32	Jul 15, 1995	Arena Panama Al Brown, Colón, Panama	Won vacant Panamanian welterweight title
10	Win	10–0	Marcelino Quiroz	KO	2 (8), 2:35	Apr 1, 1995	Gimnasio Nuevo Panama, Panama City, Panama	
9	Win	9–0	Rafael Ortiz	KO	1 (10)	Feb 4, 1995	Arena Panama Al Brown, Colón, Panama	
8	Win	8–0	Felix Jose Hernandez	TKO	2 (10)	Oct 15, 1994	Arena Panama Al Brown, Colón, Panama	
7	Win	7–0	Jaime Mayorga	TKO	1 (12), 1:45	Sep 3, 1994	Colón, Panama	Won vacant WBC FECARBOX welterweight title
6	Win	6–0	Edison Martinez	TKO	1 (8), 1:49	Jun 4, 1994	Arena Panama Al Brown, Colón, Panama	
5	Win	5–0	Manuel Alvarez	SD	8	Feb 5, 1994	Gimnasio Nuevo Panama, Panama City, Panama	
4	Win	4–0	Ramon Barrera	TKO	1 (6)	Dec 28, 1993	Gimnasio Nuevo Panama, Panama City, Panama	
3	Win	3–0	Jorge Eliecer Ortiz	TKO	1 (4), 2:18	Dec 4, 1993	Gimnasio Nuevo Panama, Panama City, Panama	
2	Win	2–0	Manuel Florian	UD	4	Oct 16, 1993	Arena Panama Al Brown, Colón, Panama	
1	Win	1–0	Gabriel Camarena	TKO	1 (4), 1:25	Jul 17, 1993	Gimnasio Nuevo Panama, Panama City, Panama	

Sporting positions
Regional boxing titles
Vacant Title last held by Felix Rojas	WBC FECARBOX welterweight champion September 3, 1994 – August 1995; Vacated	Vacant Title next held by Nino Cirilo
Vacant Title last held by Eduardo Rodriguez	Panamanian welterweight champion July 15, 1995 – June 1996; Vacated	Vacant Title next held by Tito Mendoza
Vacant Title last held by Andrew Murray	WBA Fedelatin welterweight champion August 5, 1995 – June 1996; Vacated	Vacant Title next held by Andrew Murray
Vacant Title last held by Jose Orlando Aguirre	WBA Fedelatin super welterweight champion June 15, 1996 – September 27, 1997	Succeeded by David Noel
Preceded by David Noel	WBA Fedelatin super welterweight champion November 29, 1997 – February 13, 1998; Lost bid for world title	Vacant Title next held by Javier Castillo
Vacant Title last held by Luis Andres Pineda	WBA Fedelatin cruiserweight champion March 16, 2004 – May 2005; Vacated	Vacant Title next held by Luis Andres Pineda
Vacant Title last held by Jorge Kahwagi	WBC Latino cruiserweight champion December 3, 2004 – March 2006; Vacated	Vacant Title next held by Eliseo Castillo
Vacant Title last held by Luis Andres Pineda	WBA Fedelatin cruiserweight champion September 3, 2005 – December 2005; Vacated	Vacant Title next held by Luis Andres Pineda
Vacant Title last held by Andrey Fedosov	WBA Fedelatin heavyweight champion November 18, 2017 – present	Incumbent
World boxing titles
Preceded by Firat Arslan	WBA cruiserweight champion September 27, 2008 – October 30, 2012; Status changed	Succeeded by Denis Lebedev
Honorary boxing titles
New title	WBA cruiserweight champion In recess October 30, 2012 – May 17, 2013; Failed to regain world title	Vacant Title next held by Denis Lebedev
