= Valery Brudov =

Russian boxer (born 1976)

Valery Brudov Валерий Брудов
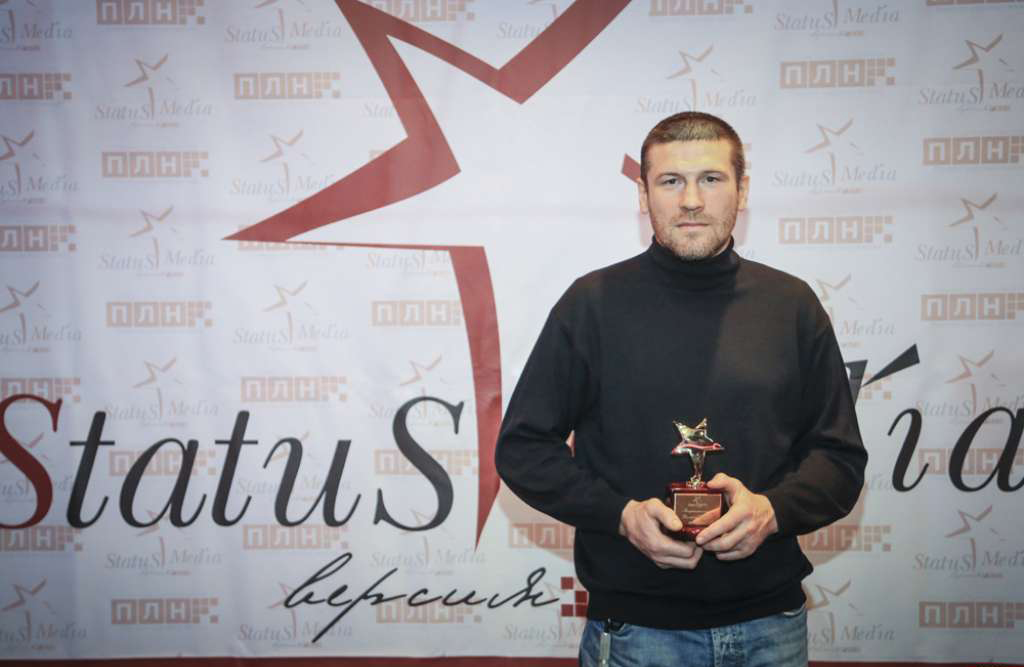

Personal information
- Born: November 27, 1976 (age 49) Novosokolniki, Russian SFSR, USSR (nowadays Russia)
- Height: 6 ft 2 1/2 in (189 cm)
- Weight: Cruiserweight

Boxing career
- Stance: Orthodox

Boxing record
- Total fights: 59
- Wins: 44
- Win by KO: 30
- Losses: 15

Valery Alexandrovich Brudov (Russian: Валерий Александрович Брудов; born November 27, 1976) in Pskov, Russia is a former professional boxer. He held the WBA interim world cruiserweight title from 2006 until 2007, and challenged twice for the undisputed version of that title in 2006 and 2010. He also challenged once for the interim WBO cruiserweight title in 2012.

== Professional career ==
He turned pro in 1999 winning his first 30 contests. This garnered him a WBC regional title and winning a WBA eliminator. His first shot at a world title came against Virgil Hill for the vacant Regular title in 2006, after Jean-Marc Mormeck was promoted to Super Champion. Valery lost a lopsided decision to the veteran. Hill was inactive for the rest of the year and Brudov scored a TKO over Luis Andres Pineda in December to become the inaugural Interim Champion. That reign only last six months when he lost a split decision to Firat Arslan. He challenged Guillermo Jones for the full championship in 2010, but was stopped in eleven rounds.

== Professional boxing record ==
59 fights	44 wins	15 losses
By knockout	30	8
By decision	14	7

No.	Result	Record	Opponent	Type	Round, time	Date	Location	Notes
59	Loss	44–15	Joel Tambwe Djeko	UD	6 (6)	2018-12-08	Palais des Sports, Levallois-Perret, France	
58	Loss	44–14	Tervel Pulev	UD	8 (8)	2018-03-10	Bruno Gehrke Halle, Spandau, Germany	
57	Loss	44–13	Ditlev Rossing	SD	8 (8)	2017-10-28	Frederiksberghallen, Copenhagen, Denmark	
56	Loss	44–12	Yury Kashinsky	RTD	5 (10)	2017-05-05	DIVS, Yekaterinburg, Russia	For WBO Oriental cruiserweight title
55	Win	44–11	Alexander Tikhonov	TKO	1 (6)	2017-04-07	Boxing & Gym Academy, Moscow, Russia	
54	Loss	43–11	Artush Sarkisyan	TKO	3 (8)	2016-12-15	Qin Shi Huang Restaurant, Saint Petersburg, Russia	
53	Loss	43–10	Adam Balski	TKO	5 (8)	2016-09-24	Kalisz Arena Sports Hall, Kalisz, Poland	
52	Loss	43–9	Artur Mann	UD	8 (8)	2016-05-07	Barclaycard Arena, Hamburg, Germany	
51	Win	43–8	Vladislav Tonchinsky	TKO	3 (6)	2016-04-22	SuperClub, Pskov, Russia	
50	Loss	42–8	Krzysztof Włodarczyk	TKO	2 (8)	2016-03-04	Hala Sportowa Zeromskiego 9, Sosnowiec, Poland	
49	Loss	42–7	Noel Mikaelian	UD	10 (10)	2016-01-09	Baden-Arena, Offenburg, Germany	For WBO International cruiserweight title
48	Loss	42–6	Rakhim Chakhkiev	KO	4 (10)	2015-04-10	Luzhniki Palace of Sports, Moscow, Russia	
47	Win	42–5	Sergey Beloshapkin	UD	8 (8)	2015-02-13	Ice Palace, Pskov, Russia	
46	Loss	41–5	Tony Bellew	KO	12 (12)	2014-03-15	Echo Arena, Liverpool, England, U.K.	For vacant WBO International cruiserweight title
45	Win	41–4	Jevgenijs Andrejevs	UD	6 (6)	2013-08-31	Open Air Theatre, Krasnogorsk, Russia	
44	Win	40–4	Sergey Gorokhov	UD	8 (8)	2013-06-27	Gigant Hall Parakhod, Pskov, Russia	
43	Loss	39–4	Ola Afolabi	RTD	5 (12)	3 Mar 2012	ESPRIT arena, Düsseldorf, Germany	For WBO cruiserweight title
42	Win	39–3	Jim Franklin	TKO	2 (8)	25 Jun 2011	Family Arena, Saint Charles, Missouri, U.S.	
41	Loss	38–3	Guillermo Jones	TKO	11 (12)	2010-10-02	Roberto Durán Arena, Panama City, Panama	For WBA cruiserweight title
40	Win	38–2	Yavor Marinchev	UD	6 (6)	2009-06-27	La Palestre, Le Cannet, France	
39	Win	37–2	DeAndrey Abron	TKO	7 (10)	2008-11-27	Yubileyny Sports Palace, Saint Petersburg, Russia	
38	Win	36–2	David Greter	RTD	7 (8)	2008-09-18	Cirque d'hiver, Paris, France	
37	Win	35–2	Martial Bella Oleme	UD	8 (8)	2008-03-23	Malakhit, Chelyabinsk, Russia	
36	Win	34–2	Aleksandrs Borhovs	UD	8 (8)	2007-10-27	Club Olimpic, Saint Petersburg, Russia	
35	Loss	33–2	Firat Arslan	SD	12 (12)	2007-06-16	SYMA Sports Centre, Budapest, Hungary	Lost interim WBA cruiserweight title
34	Win	33–1	Luis Andres Pineda	TKO	11 (12)	2006-12-02	Palais Omnisport de Paris-Bercy, Paris, France	Won interim WBA cruiserweight title
33	Win	32–1	Romans Dabolins	RTD	3 (8)	2006-10-12	Casino Conti Giant Hall, Saint Petersburg, Russia	
32	Win	31–1	Aleksejs Kosobokovs	UD	8 (8)	2006-07-15	La Palestre, Le Cannet, France	
31	Loss	30–1	Virgil Hill	UD	12 (12)	2006-01-27	Tropicana Casino & Resort, Atlantic City, New Jersey, U.S.	For vacant (Regular) WBA cruiserweight title
30	Win	30–0	Rogerio Cacciatore	KO	1 (8)	2005-04-29	Palais des Sports, Marseille, France	
29	Win	29–0	Eduardo Franca	KO	2 (8)	2005-03-14	Palais des Sports, Paris, France	
28	Win	28–0	Radoslav Milutinovic	TKO	3 (8)	2004-05-27	Zénith d'Auvergne, Clermont-Ferrand, France	
27	Win	27–0	Miguel Angel Antonio Aguirre	TKO	5 (8)	2004-03-20	Palais des Sports de Gerland, Lyon, France	
26	Win	26–0	Daniel Rowsell	TKO	1 (12)	2003-12-16	Palais des Sports, Levallois-Perret, France	
25	Win	25–0	Bruce Oezbek	TKO	1 (8)	2003-11-14	Palais des Sports, Levallois-Perret, France	
24	Win	24–0	Rene Janvier	TKO	4 (8)	2003-07-04	Futuroscope, Chasseneuil-du-Poitou, France	
23	Win	23–0	Salim Debiane	KO	1 (8)	2003-04-04	Maison des Sports, Clermont-Ferrand, France	
22	Win	22–0	Mohamed Siluvangi	KO	1 (8)	2003-02-24	Palais des Sports, Levallois-Perret, France	
21	Win	21–0	Igor Pylypenko	TKO	3 (10)	2002-09-01	Concert Hall, Pskov, Russia	Won vacant WBC CISBB cruiserweight title
20	Win	20–0	Vladislav Lashkov	TKO	3 (6)	2002-06-13	Casino Conti Giant Hall, Saint Petersburg, Russia	
19	Win	19–0	Vladimir Danilovich	UD	6 (6)	2002-04-28	Pskov, Russia	
18	Win	18–0	Sylver Niangou	PTS	6 (6)	2002-02-26	Clermont-Ferrand, France	
17	Win	17–0	Rene Janvier	TKO	5 (8)	2002-01-29	Les Pennes-Mirabeau, France	
16	Win	16–0	Roger Foe	TKO	2 (6)	2002-01-18	Clermont-Ferrand, France	
15	Win	15–0	Henry Mobio	PTS	8 (8)	2001-11-24	Palais des Sports, Bondy, France	
14	Win	14–0	Valeri Semiskur	RTD	4 (12)	2001-09-02	Pskov, Russia	Won vacant Russian cruiserweight title
13	Win	13–0	Artem Vychkin	UD	6 (6)	2001-08-10	Malakhit, Chelyabinsk, Russia	
12	Win	12–0	Mihail Bekish	UD	6 (6)	2001-06-07	Casino Conti Giant Hall, Saint Petersburg, Russia	
11	Win	11–0	Aleh Tsukanau	TKO	3 (4)	2001-05-12	Casino Conti Giant Hall, Saint Petersburg, Russia	
10	Win	10–0	Igor Pylypenko	UD	4 (4)	2001-03-22	Casino Conti Giant Hall, Saint Petersburg, Russia	
9	Win	9–0	Frank Wuestenberghs	TKO	3 (6)	2001-02-13	Pont-Audemer, France	
8	Win	8–0	Yevhen Bets	TKO	1 (4)	2000-12-20	Saint Petersburg, Russia	
7	Win	7–0	Julius Gal	KO	1 (6)	2000-11-30	Élancourt, France	
6	Win	6–0	Anatoly Grebenyukov	TKO	3 (4)	2000-10-29	Yubileyny Sports Palace, Saint Petersburg, Russia	
5	Win	5–0	Vladislav Berlev	TKO	2 (4)	2000-10-08	Casino Conti Giant Hall, Saint Petersburg, Russia	
4	Win	4–0	Serhiy Mykhed	TKO	2 (6)	2000-07-18	Romazan Ice Sports Palace, Magnitogorsk, Russia	
3	Win	3–0	Siarhei Khomiakou	TKO	2 (?)	2000-05-27	Saint Petersburg, Russia	
2	Win	2–0	Vladislav Berlev	UD	4 (4)	2000-03-11	Casino Conti Giant Hall, Saint Petersburg, Russia	
1	Win	1–0	Dmitry Kalistratov	TKO	1 (4)	1999-12-28	Saint Petersburg, Russia	

Sporting positions
Regional boxing titles
Vacant Title last held by Yan Kulkov	Russian cruiserweight champion September 2, 2001 – 2001; Vacated	Vacant Title next held by Vadim Tokarev
Vacant Title last held by Alexander Gurov	WBC CISBB cruiserweight champion September 1, 2002 – 2006; Vacated	Vacant Title next held by Mikhail Nasyrov
World boxing titles
New title	WBA cruiserweight champion Interim title December 2, 2006 – June 16, 2007	Succeeded by Firat Arslan
