= Grigory Drozd =

Russian boxer

Grigory Drozd Григорий Анатольевич Дрозд
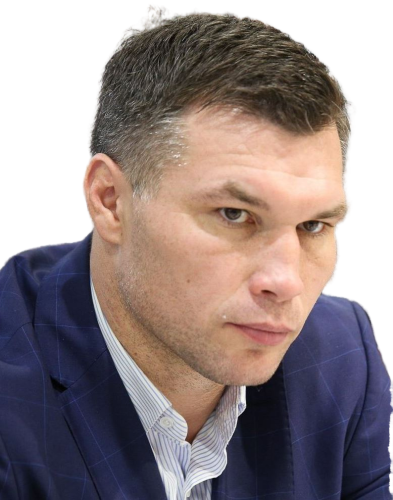

Personal information
- Nickname: Pretty Boy
- Nationality: Russian
- Born: Grigory Anatolyevich Drozd; 26 August 1979 (age 47) Prokopyevsk, Russian SFSR, Soviet Union (now Russia)
- Height: 6 ft 1 in (185 cm)
- Weight: Cruiserweight

Boxing career
- Reach: 76 in (193 cm)
- Stance: Orthodox

Boxing record
- Total fights: 41
- Wins: 40
- Win by KO: 28
- Losses: 1

Grigory Anatolyevich Drozd (Russian: Григорий Анатольевич Дрозд; born 26 August 1979) is a Russian former professional boxer. He held the World Boxing Council (WBC) cruiserweight title from 2014 to 2016, and the European cruiserweight title from 2013 to 2014.

== Boxing career ==
Drozd only fought three amateur fights, winning all of them. His manager is Dietmar Poszwa.

=== Drozd vs. Wilson ===
Drozd faced Darnell Wilson on July 2, 2009 at the Krylatskoye Sports Palace in Moscow, winning the fight in the tenth round.

=== Drozd vs. Simms ===
He fought Michael Simms on February 23, 2008, at the DIVS in Ekaterinburg with an attendance of 25,000 at the stadium. The fight went eight rounds and Drozd won the fight via unanimous decision.

=== Drozd vs. Calloway ===
On 6 December 2008, Drozd Fought Rob Calloway for the vacant WBO Asia Pacific Cruiserweight title, vacant WBC Asian Boxing Council Cruiserweight title and the vacant PABA Cruiserweight title at the circus in Nizhny Novgorod. It was voted Asian Super Fight of the year, with Drozd winning by seventh-round technical knockout.

=== Drozd vs. Masternak ===
On October 5, 2013, Drozd won the EBU (European) Cruiserweight title in Moscow by defeating Mateusz Masternak via eleventh-round technical knockout.

=== Drozd vs. Quanna ===
Drozd retained the title against mandatory challenger Jeremy Ouanna on March 15, 2014.

=== Drozd vs. Wlodarczyk ===
In his next bout, Drozd won his first world title by defeating Krzysztof Włodarczyk on September 27, 2014, to win the WBC Cruiserweight title. Drozd won the fight convincingly, with the judges scoring it 119-108, 119-108 and 118-109 in favor of Drozd.

=== Drozd vs. Janik ===
In his next bout, Drozd fought Lukasz Janik, which was his first title defence. Drozd beat Lukasz Janik by technical knockout in the 9th round.

Drozd lost the WBC cruiserweight title at the end of May 2016 when he was unable to defend it due to injury, and Tony Bellew defeated Ilunga Makabu in three rounds to win it. Instead he was made champion in recess, but was removed from that position due to inactivity in December 2016. He has not fought since.

== Professional boxing record ==
| 41 fights | 40 wins | 1 loss |
|---|---|---|
| By knockout | 28 | 1 |
| By decision | 11 | 0 |
| By disqualification | 1 | 0 |

| No. | Result | Record | Opponent | Type | Round, time | Date | Location | Notes |
|---|---|---|---|---|---|---|---|---|
| 41 | Win | 40–1 | Łukasz Janik | TKO | 9 (12), 0:50 | 2015-05-22 | Olympic Indoor Arena, Moscow, Russia | Retained WBC cruiserweight title |
| 40 | Win | 39–1 | Krzysztof Włodarczyk | UD | 12 | 2014-09-27 | Krylatskoye Sports Palace, Moscow, Russia | Won WBC cruiserweight title |
| 39 | Win | 38–1 | Jeremy Ouanna | KO | 1 (12), 2:40 | 2014-03-15 | Krylatskoye Sports Palace, Moscow, Russia | Retained European cruiserweight title |
| 38 | Win | 37–1 | Mateusz Masternak | TKO | 11 (12), 0:53 | 2013-10-05 | Olympic Indoor Arena, Moscow, Russia | Won European cruiserweight title |
| 37 | Win | 36–1 | Jean Marc Monrose | UD | 12 | 2012-12-17 | Crocus City Hall, Moscow, Russia | Won vacant WBA International cruiserweight title |
| 36 | Win | 35–1 | Fabio Garrido | TKO | 1 (10), 0:45 | 2012-06-20 | CSKA, Moscow, Russia | |
| 35 | Win | 34–1 | Richard Hall | RTD | 8 (10), 3:00 | 2012-02-08 | USC Soviet Wings, Moscow, Russia | |
| 34 | Win | 33–1 | Remigijus Ziausys | UD | 8 | 2011-03-11 | Arena, Kemerovo, Russia | |
| 33 | Win | 32–1 | Darnell Wilson | RTD | 10 (12), 3:00 | 2009-07-02 | Krylatskoye Sports Palace, Moscow, Russia | Retained WBO Asia Pacific and PABA cruiserweight titles |
| 32 | Win | 31–1 | Rob Calloway | TKO | 7 (12), 1:25 | 2008-12-06 | Circus, Nizhny Novgorod, Russia | Won vacant WBO, WBC Asian and PABA cruiserweight titles |
| 31 | Win | 30–1 | Talgat Dosanov | UD | 8 | 2008-07-31 | Pyramid, Kazan, Russia | |
| 30 | Win | 29–1 | Michael Simms | UD | 8 | 2008-02-23 | DIVS, Ekaterinburg, Russia | |
| 29 | Win | 28–1 | Laudelino Barros | KO | 8 (12), 2:22 | 2007-11-17 | Bordelandhalle, Magdeburg, Germany | Retained WBO Asia Pacific cruiserweight title |
| 28 | Win | 27–1 | Jean Claude Bikoi | UD | 12 | 2007-07-28 | Burg-Waechter Castello, Düsseldorf, Germany | Won vacant WBO Asia Pacific cruiserweight title |
| 27 | Win | 26–1 | Mircea Telecan | KO | 1 (8), 2:35 | 2007-02-17 | Maritim Hotel, Magdeburg, Germany | |
| 26 | Loss | 25–1 | Firat Arslan | TKO | 5 (12), 2:28 | 2006-10-28 | Porsche-Arena, Stuttgart, Germany | |
| 25 | Win | 25–0 | Mauro Adrian Ordiales | TKO | 3 (12), 2:15 | 2006-07-29 | König Pilsener Arena, Oberhausen, Germany | Won vacant WBC International cruiserweight title |
| 24 | Win | 24–0 | Pavel Melkomyan | KO | 5 (10), 0:44 | 2006-01-07 | Zenith, Munich, Munich, Germany | |
| 23 | Win | 23–0 | Shane Swartz | TKO | 7 (10) | 2005-10-25 | TV-Studio 44, Vienna, Austria | |
| 22 | Win | 22–0 | Asmir Vojnovic | TKO | 8 (10) | 2005-04-15 | DIVS, Ekaterinburg, Russia | |
| 21 | Win | 21–0 | Denis Salomka | KO | 2 (8) | 2005-02-01 | Casino Kapitalizm, Moscow, Russia | |
| 20 | Win | 20–0 | Jason Robinson | UD | 10 | 2004-10-01 | Basket-Hall Arena, Kazan, Russia | |
| 19 | Win | 19–0 | Saúl Montana | TKO | 9 (12), 2:02 | 2004-03-30 | Great Western Forum, Inglewood, California, U.S. | Won vacant IBO Intercontinental cruiserweight title |
| 18 | Win | 18–0 | Muslim Biarslanov | TKO | 3 (10) | 2003-12-03 | DIVS, Ekaterinburg, Russia | |
| 17 | Win | 17–0 | Yan Kulkov | TKO | 5 (10) | 2003-08-31 | Prokopyevsk, Russia | Won vacant Russian cruiserweight title |
| 16 | Win | 16–0 | Oleksandr Garashchenko | UD | 8 | 2003-06-06 | Express, Rostov-on-Don, Russia | |
| 15 | Win | 15–0 | Oleksandr Subin | UD | 8 | 2003-04-08 | Moscow, Russia | |
| 14 | Win | 14–0 | Akmal Aslanov | TKO | 4 (8) | 2003-01-30 | Casino Vodoley, Ekaterinburg, Russia | |
| 13 | Win | 13–0 | Pavel Kalabin | TKO | 4 (10) | 2002-12-25 | Pyramide, Kazan, Russia | |
| 12 | Win | 12–0 | Ihor Pylypenko | DQ | 3 (6) | 2002-11-15 | Circus, Zaporizhia, Ukraine | |
| 11 | Win | 11–0 | Teymuraz Kekelidze | UD | 10 | 2002-08-25 | Prokopyevsk, Russia | Won vacant Ural & Siberia cruiserweight title |
| 10 | Win | 10–0 | Sedrak Agagulyan | TKO | 4 (8) | 2002-07-04 | Casino Vodoley, Ekaterinburg, Russia | |
| 9 | Win | 9–0 | Mikhail Balovnev | TKO | 5 (8) | 2002-05-23 | Casino Vodoley, Ekaterinburg, Russia | |
| 8 | Win | 8–0 | Siarhei Krupenich | TKO | 5 (6) | 2002-04-25 | Perm, Russia | |
| 7 | Win | 7–0 | Dmitry Gerasimov | TKO | 4 (6) | 2002-03-28 | Perm, Russia | |
| 6 | Win | 6–0 | Yuriy Bylynchuk | TKO | 4 (6) | 2002-02-28 | Ekaterinburg, Russia | |
| 5 | Win | 5–0 | Evgeny Galchenko | TKO | 2 (6) | 2001-12-21 | Ekaterinburg, Russia | |
| 4 | Win | 4–0 | Valery Makeev | TKO | 5 (6) | 2001-10-28 | Culture & Sports Complex, Ekaterinburg, Russia | |
| 3 | Win | 3–0 | Cesar Ramos | TKO | 3 (6) | 2001-08-24 | Prokopyevsk, Russia | |
| 2 | Win | 2–0 | Timofey Maklakov | TKO | 2 (6) | 2001-07-24 | KRC Arbat, Moscow, Russia | |
| 1 | Win | 1–0 | Valeri Semiskur | UD | 6 | 2001-04-13 | CSKA Universal Sports Hall, Moscow, Russia | |

== See also ==
- List of world cruiserweight boxing champions

Sporting positions
Regional boxing titles
| Preceded by Mateusz Masternak | EBU cruiserweight champion October 5, 2013 – 2014; Vacated | Vacant Title next held by Rakhim Chakhkiev |
World boxing titles
| Preceded by Krzysztof Włodarczyk | WBC cruiserweight champion September 27, 2014 – March 16, 2016; Status changed | Vacant Title next held by Tony Bellew |
Honorary boxing titles
| New title | WBC cruiserweight champion In recess March 16, 2016 – December, 2016; Stripped | Vacant |
