= Paweł Kołodziej =

Polish boxer

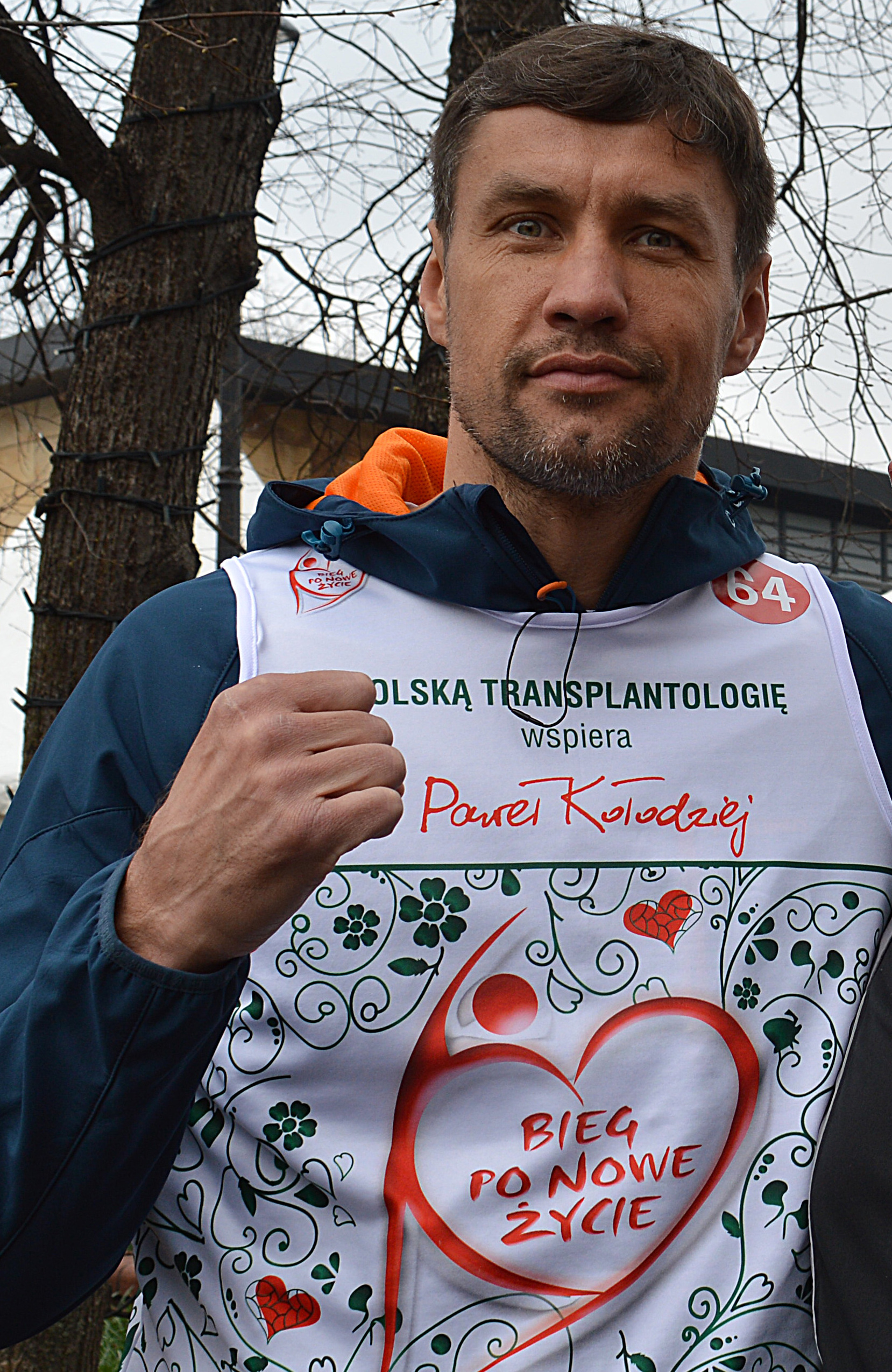

Personal information
- Nickname: Harnaś
- Nationality: (Poland) Polish
- Born: Paweł Kołodziej; September 24, 1980 (age 45) Krynica Zdrój
- Height: 6 ft 4 in (1.93 m)
- Weight: Cruiserweight; Heavyweight

Boxing career
- Reach: 77 in (196 cm)
- Stance: Orthodox

Boxing record
- Total fights: 35
- Wins: 34
- Win by KO: 19
- Losses: 1
- Draws: 0
- No contests: 0

Paweł Kołodziej (born 24 September 1980 in Krynica-Zdrój, Poland) is a Polish professional boxer, fighting in the cruiserweight and Heavyweight division. Kołodziej is the current IBF Inter-Continental Cruiserweight champion. Kołodziej won the belt against Giulian Ilie of Romania.

== Career ==
Kołodziej is a former IBC (International Boxing Council) champion. The Polish cruiserweight won the vacant title in July 2009 in Ruda Śląska, Poland. Then, by unanimous decision over Czech Roman Kracik. The Pole successfully defended the belt in December 2009 in Łódź, defeating an American journeyman Rob Calloway by RTD in the sixth round of the bout. Previously, in 2006, Kołodziej won the WBC Youth belt and defended the title three times until 2008.

=== Kołodziej vs Calloway ===
"The fight against Calloway will be a test of my means. I respect his experience but I believe that if I box wisely and take advantage of my height, I will leave the ring as a winner" said 1.95m tall Kołodziej before the most difficult battle in his professional career. The 40-year-old rival's record was quite impressive – 70 victories (including 57 knockouts) and 10 defeats. However, the '84 born Pole managed to stop the experienced Rob Calloway at MOSiR hall in Łódź and defended his IBC belt.

Kołodziej floored Calloway with a powerful straight right as early as at the finish of the first round. The second one was also firmly won by “Harnaś” who bombarded his extraordinarily experienced rival with series of punches. 40-year-old American found himself on the canvas for a second time in the round three. Kołodziej had no mercy also in the fifth part of the battle, dropping “All-American Prizefighter” twice. After the sixth round, Calloway’s corner reasonably decided to stop this uneven bout.

"I approached this fight very seriously, I was a bit nervous. I am content with the victory but I didn’t do everything I had planned. Sometimes I let him go too far" Kołodziej modestly said while being interviewed by Bokser.org after the clash. "I got a bit irritated that I couldn’t emphasise my victory. If he had fought the next round, I would certainly have knocked him out.".

=== Kołodziej vs Krence ===
Originally, the 29-year-old Kołodziej had to defend his IBC title in the upcoming bout but the decision was changed a few days before the bout. - World Boxing Foundation (WBFo) is more active and dynamic than IBC, so when the opportunity of the championship fight occurred, we decided to take it without thinking – explained Andrzej Wasilewski, the promising Pole's promoter.

== Professional Record ==
34 Wins (19 knockouts), 1 Loss, 0 Draw
Result	Record	Opponent	Type	Round	Date	Location	Notes
Win	34-1	(Poland) Wladimir Letr	KO	2 (6), 2:58	2016-03-04	(Poland) MOSiR Hall, Sosnowiec	
Loss	33–1	(Russia) Denis Lebedev	TKO	2 (12), 2:08	2014-09-27	(Russia) Krylatskoye Sports Palace, Moscow	For WBA Cruiserweight title.
Win	33–0	(Germany) Prince Anthony Ikeji	TKO	7 (8)	2013-11-23	(Poland) Sport Hall, Jastrzebie Zdrój	
Win	32–0	(Argentina) Cesar David Crenz	UD	8	2013-06-15	(Poland) Łuczniczka, Bydgoszcz	
Win	31–0	(Jamaica) Richard Hall	UD	8	2013-04-20	(Poland) Sport Hall, Rzeszów	
Win	30–0	(Romania) Giulian Ilie	UD	12	2012-03-17	(Poland) Sport Hall, Krynica Zdrój	Won IBF Inter-Continental Cruiserweight title.
Win	29–0	(Argentina) Mauro Adrian Ordiales	TKO	2 (10), 2:27	2011-11-1	(Poland) Sport Hall, Gdynia	Retained WBA International Cruiserweight title.
Win	28–0	(United States) Felix Cora Jr.	UD	12	2011-03-05	(Poland) Sport Hall, Krynica Zdrój	Won vacant WBA International Cruiserweight title.
Win	27–0	(United States) John McClain	KO	3 (10), 2:48	2010-11-20	(Poland) Hall, Nysa	Won interim WBC Baltic Cruiserweight title.
Win	26–0	(France) Parfait Amougui Amougou	KO	12 (12), 2:18	2010-06-12	(Poland) Sport Hall, Krynica Zdrój	Retained WBF Cruiserweight title.
Win	25–0	(United Kingdom) Mark Krence	TKO	3 (12), 3:00	2010-03-20	(Poland) Sport Hall, Strzelce Opolskie	Won vacant WBF Cruiserweight title.
Win	24–0	(United States) Rob Calloway	RTD	6 (12), 3:00	2009-12-18	(Poland) MOSiR Hall, Łódź	Retained IBO Cruiserweight title.
Win	23–0	(Czech Republic) Roman Kracik	UD	12	2009-06-20	(Poland) City Place, Ruda Śląska	Won vacant IBO Cruiserweight title.
Win	22–0	(Hungary) Laszlo Hubert	UD	8	2008-12-13	(Poland) MOSiR Hall, Ketrzyn	
Win	21–0	(Hungary) Jozsef Nagy	TD	7 (12), 1:25	2008-05-31	(Poland) Sport Hall, Legnica	
Win	20–0	(Hungary) Laszlo Hubert	KO	7 (10), 2:31	2008-02-09	(Poland) Sport Hall, Lublin	Retained WBC Youth Cruiserweight title.
Win	19–0	(Portugal) Jose Manuel Barreira	RTD	4 (8), 3:00	2007-12-15	(Poland) Sport Hall, Rzeszów	
Win	18–0	(Romania) Istvan Varga	TKO	4 (10), 2:51	2007-09-22	(Poland) City Hall, Bytom	Retained WBC Youth Cruiserweight title.
Win	17–0	(Georgia (country)) Armen Azizian	UD	10	2007-02-24	(Poland) Sport Hall, Głogów	Retained WBC Youth Cruiserweight title.
Win	16–0	(Lithuania) Remigijus Ziausys	UD	8	2006-11-04	(Germany) RWE Sporthalle, Mülheim	
Win	15–0	(Hungary) Adrian Rajkai	KO	6 (10), 2:03	2006-07-01	(Poland) KOSiR, Kępno	Won WBC Youth Cruiserweight title.
Win	14–0	(France) Nabil Haciani	KO	1 (6), 2:56	2006-06-03	(Germany) TUI Arena, Hannover	
Win	13–0	(Ukraine) Oleksandr Subin	TKO	4 (10)	2006-05-06	(Poland) MOSiR Hall, Krosno	
Win	12–0	(Romania) Mircea Telecan	UD	6	2006-02-25	(Poland) OSiR, Wołów	
Win	11–0	(Croatia) Igor Marić	TKO	3 (6)	2005-12-17	(Germany) Max Halle, Prenzlauer Berg	
Win	10–0	(United States) Neil Stephens	KO	1 (6), 2:59	2005-11-26	(United States) Copernicus Center, Chicago	
Win	9–0	(Slovakia) Imrich Borka	TKO	6 (6)	2005-10-15	(Poland) Sport Hall, Rzeszów	
Win	8–0	(Latvia) Aleksejs Kosobokovs	UD	6	2005-10-01	(Germany) EWE-Arena, Oldenburg	
Win	7–0	(Ukraine) Mohamed Ali Bouraoui	TKO	1 (6), 2:03	2005-05-14	(Germany) Sport Halle, Bayreuth	
Win	6–0	(Czech Republic) Ervin Slonka	UD	6	2005-04-16	(Poland) Sport Hall, Bydgoszcz	
Win	5–0	(Slovakia) Juraj Ondricko	TKO	2 (6)	2005-03-12	(Poland) Sport Arena, Poznań	
Win	4–0	(Czech Republic) Pavel Cirok	TKO	3 (6)	2005-02-19	(Poland) OSiR Wołów	
Win	3–0	(Slovakia) Ladislav Slezak	TKO	2 (4)	2004-12-19	(Poland) Sport Hall, Rzeszów	
Win	2–0	(Czech Republic) Ervin Slonka	PTS	4	2004-11-20	(Poland) Sport Hall, Strzelce Opolskie	
Win	1–0	(Slovakia) Sylvester Petrović	UD	4	2004-09-25	(Poland) Sport Hall, Opole	Kołodziej's professional debut
