= Christophe Dettinger =

French boxer

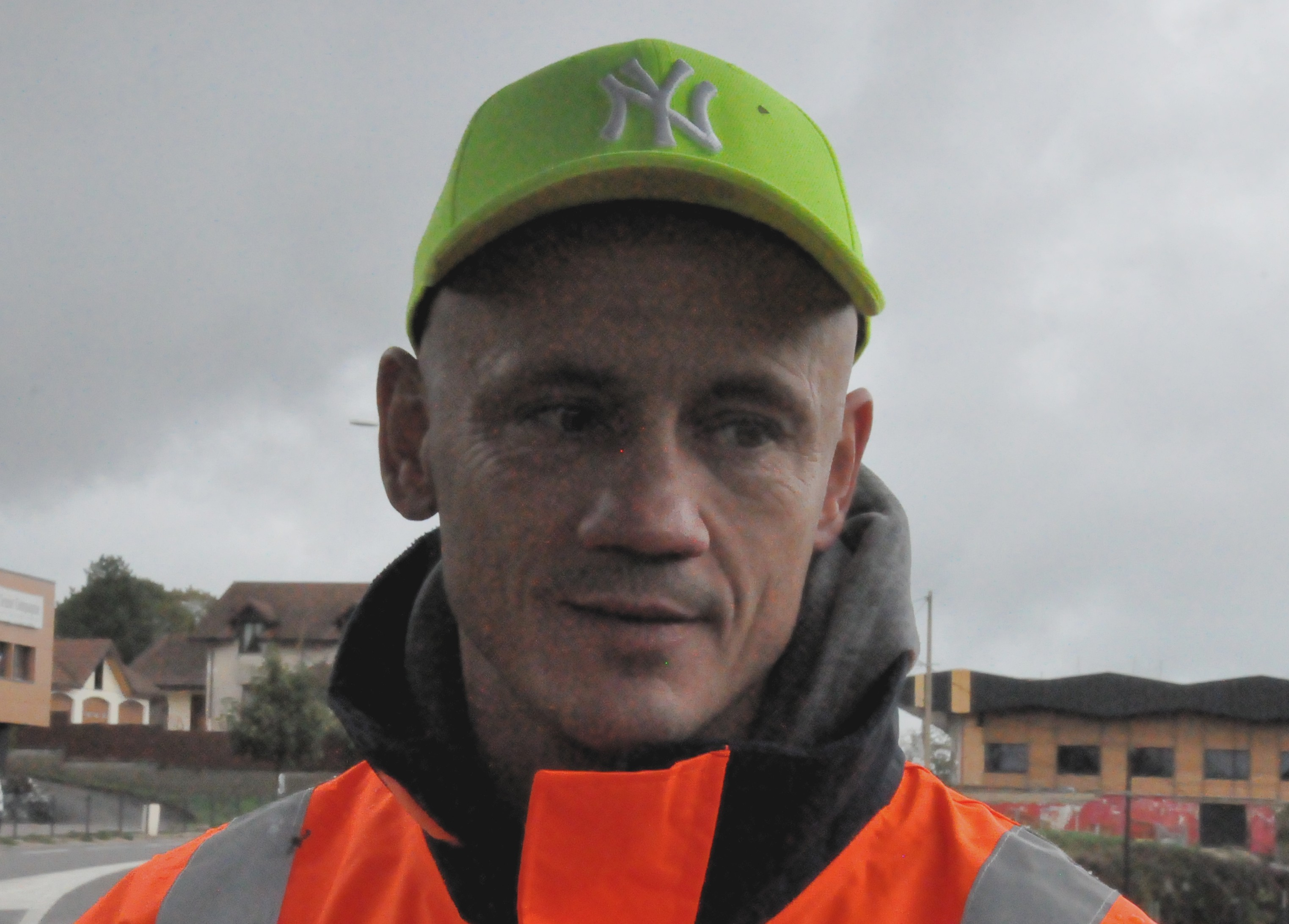
- Christophe Dettinger Street art Graffiti in Aubervilliers

Personal information
- Nicknames: Le Gitan de Massy (i.e., The Gypsy from Massy)
- Nationality: French
- Born: May 3, 1981 (age 45)
- Height: 192 cm (6 ft 4 in)
- Weight: Cruiserweight

Boxing career

Boxing record
- Total fights: 22
- Wins: 18
- Win by KO: 7
- Losses: 3
- Draws: 1

Christophe Dettinger, known as the "Gypsy of Massy" (born 3 May 1981), is a French professional boxer. He was the French Cruiserweight champion in 2007 and 2008. His career ended in 2013. In 2019, he was convicted of punching back two mobile gendarmes after clashes in Paris as part of the Yellow Vest Movement.

== Boxing career ==
October 30, 2007, he became the French champion in the Cruiserweight weight class, by beating Kamel Amrane.

== Professional boxing record ==
23 fights	18 wins	4 losses
By knockout	7	3
By decision	11	1
Draws	1	

No.	Result	Record	Opponent	Type	Round, time	Date	Location	Notes
23	Loss	18–4–1	Jean Marc Monrose	TKO	2 (10)	6 Dec 2013	Centre Omnisports, Massy, France	For vacant French cruiserweight title
22	Win	18–3–1	Jiří Svačina	MD	6	30 Mar 2013	Centre Omnisports, Massy, France	
21	Loss	17–3–1	Ismail Abdoul	UD	12	28 Sep 2012	Topsporthal Vlaanderen, Ghent, Belgium	For vacant WBC Mediterranean cruiserweight title
20	Win	17–2–1	Marko Angermann	PTS	6	4 May 2012	Palais des sports Marcel-Cerdan, Paris, France	
19	Loss	16–2–1	Faisal Ibnel Arrami	TKO	9 (10)	2 Dec 2011	Centre Omnisports, Massy, France	For French cruiserweight title
18	Win	16–1–1	Gnenege Ble	MD	6	21 Oct 2011	Salle Pierre Scohy, Aulnay-sous-Bois, France	
17	Win	15–1–1	Krisztián Jaksi	RTD	4 (8)	27 May 2011	Salle Pierre de Coubertin, Massy, France	
16	Win	14–1–1	Gnenege Ble	PTS	6	4 Mar 2011	Salle Albert Camus, Creil, France	
15	Win	13–1–1	Julien Perriaux	UD	6	4 Dec 2009	Palais des Sports, Agde, France	
14	Win	12–1–1	Malik Yahiaoui	SD	6	19 Jun 2009	Centre Omnisports, Massy, France	
13	Draw	11–1–1	Martial Bella Oleme	PTS	6	16 May 2009	Salle la Soucoupe, Saint-Nazaire, France	
12	Win	11–1	Malik Yahiaoui	RTD	2 (6)	15 Nov 2008	Salle la Soucoupe, Saint-Nazaire, France	
11	Win	10–1	Cristian Toni	RTD	4 (6)	4 Jul 2008	Salle Pierre de Coubertin, Massy, France	
10	Loss	9–1	Merick Roberge	TKO	9 (10)	3 May 2008	Salle des Huttes, Gravelines, France	Lost French cruiserweight title
9	Win	9–0	Merick Roberge	UD	10	8 Mar 2008	Salle Michel Jazy, Cugnaux, France	Retained French cruiserweight title
8	Win	8–0	Kamel Amrane	MD	10	30 Oct 2007	Centre Omnisports, Massy, France	Won vacant French cruiserweight title
7	Win	7–0	Radouane Ferchichi	UD	8	2 Jun 2007	Salle des muriers, Cannes-La-Bocca, France	
6	Win	6–0	Ramdane Serdjane	PTS	6	6 Apr 2007	Palais des Sports, Saint-Quentin, France	
5	Win	5–0	Ludovic Mace	PTS	8	3 Feb 2007	Centre Omnisports, Massy, France	Finale de la Coupe de la Ligue
4	Win	4–0	Mounir Djaadi	KO	2 (6)	9 Dec 2005	Omnisports, Massy, France	
3	Win	3–0	Robert Nacu	KO	1 (8)	23 Apr 2005	Vigneux-sur-Seine, Île-de-France, France	
2	Win	2–0	Juraj Ondricko	TKO	1 (4)	17 Feb 2005	Corbeil-Essones, Île-de-France, France	
1	Win	1–0	Peter Furman	KO	1 (4)	22 Oct 2004	Corbeil-Essonnes, Île-de-France, France	

== Yellow vests movement ==
Several videos taken during the demonstration of the Yellow vests movement of January 5, 2019 in Paris were showing him punching policemen on the Passerelle Léopold-Sédar-Senghor. Three days after punching police at Yellow vests protest, Christophe Dettinger surrendered himself. A website set up to raise funds for the boxer showed that it had received pledges of more than €114,000 The fundraiser was closed after less than 20 hours after officials expressed outrage. Anti-corruption campaigner Christophe Grébert defended the fund, saying it was legal to ask for funds to pay court costs. Shutting the fundraiser, he said, was a "bad signal for democracy".

On 13 February 2019, Dettinger was sentenced to 1 year of prison and 18 months' probation for assaulting two police officers during the protest on 5 January.
