= Sefer Seferi =

Macedonian boxer

Personal information
- Nickname: The Real Deal
- Nationality: Albanian
- Born: Sefer Seferi; 5 March 1979 (age 47) Gostivar, SR Macedonia, SFR Yugoslavia
- Height: 6 ft 2 in (188 cm)
- Weight: Cruiserweight; Heavyweight

Boxing career
- Reach: 75 in (191 cm)

Boxing record
- Total fights: 33
- Wins: 28
- Win by KO: 26
- Losses: 4
- Draws: 1

Sefer Seferi (born 5 March 1979) is an Albanian professional boxer. He has challenged once for the IBO cruiserweight title in 2019. His older brother Nuri Seferi is also a professional boxer.

== Early life ==
Seferi was born in Gostivar, SFR Yugoslavia (now North Macedonia), and is of Albanian heritage. Whilst in Yugoslavia both he and brother Nuri started out wrestling, a sport which their grandfather had competed in professionally. In 1992 the family fled from Gostivar and moved to Burgdorf, Switzerland. Both brothers took up boxing in order to help with integration into Swiss society.

== Professional career ==
Seferi made his professional debut in May 2007 in the cruiserweight division. Over the next 9 years he built up a record of 21–0 with 19 knockouts, albeit against low level opposition.

On 17 September 2016, Seferi fought former WBC heavyweight title challenger and future WBA heavyweight champion Mahmoud Charr for WBA International heavyweight title, with Seferi making the step up to heavyweight for the first time. Charr defeated Seferi by unanimous decision after 10 rounds, ending Seferi's unbeaten record.

On 20 May 2018, Seferi was announced as the first opponent for the return of former unified and lineal heavyweight champion Tyson Fury, with the fight set to take place on 9 June at Manchester Arena. The fight would be Fury's first since he beat Wladimir Klitschko to become champion more than two and half years previously in November 2015. In April 2018, several weeks before Fury's opponent was announced, several press outlets reported Seferi was rumoured to have been chosen, with Seferi himself quoted as saying, "This would make my dream come true. I never thought I'd have the chance to stand against Fury, he is my idol. Fury is a boxing legend of the 21st century. He is tall, has weight and strength but moves easily, and he dethroned Klitschko. Fury is a bear." The fight ended in a disappointing fourth round corner retirement loss for Seferi.

On 21 September 2019, he challenged Kevin Lerena in Gauteng, South Africa for his IBO cruiserweight title, but was unsuccessful and lost via third-round technical knockout.

== Professional boxing record ==
| 33 fights | 28 wins | 4 losses |
|---|---|---|
| By knockout | 26 | 3 |
| By decision | 2 | 1 |
| Draws | 1 | |

| No. | Result | Record | Opponent | Type | Round, time | Date | Location | Notes |
|---|---|---|---|---|---|---|---|---|
| 33 | Win | 28–4–1 | Mehmet Karaka | KO | 1 (6) 2:54 | 8 Jun 2025 | Next Generation Fight Club, Landau, Germany | |
| 32 | Win | 27–4–1 | Dickson Mwakisopile | RTD | 2 (10) 3:00 | 26 Jun 2024 | Saalbau, Kirchberg, Switzerland | Won vacant German International cruiserweight title |
| 31 | Win | 26–4–1 | Pascal Abel Ndomba | KO | 2 (8), 0:46 | 2 Mar 2024 | Sporthalle Gries, Volketswil, Switzerland | |
| 30 | Loss | 25–4–1 | Kem Ljungquist | RTD | 3 (12), 3:00 | 5 May 2023 | Doellefjelde Musse Marked, Nysted, Denmark | For vacant IBF International heavyweight title |
| 29 | Win | 25–3–1 | Roman Kracik | KO | 3 (12), 1:19 | 18 Jun 2022 | Sporthalle Schuetzenmatt, Burgdorf, Switzerland | Won vacant UBO cruiserweight title |
| 28 | Win | 24–3–1 | Laszlo Ivanyi | RTD | 5 (12), 3:00 | 30 Nov 2019 | Markthalle, Burgdorf, Switzerland | Won vacant UBO Inter-Continental cruiserweight title |
| 27 | Loss | 23–3–1 | Kevin Lerena | TKO | 3 (12), 2:30 | 21 Sep 2019 | Emperors Palace, Kempton Park, South Africa | For IBO cruiserweight title |
| 26 | Draw | 23–2–1 | Firat Arslan | MD | 12 | 17 Nov 2018 | Goeppingen, Baden-Württemberg, Germany | For GBU and WBO Inter-Continental cruiserweight titles |
| 25 | Loss | 23–2 | Tyson Fury | RTD | 4 (10), 3:00 | 9 Jun 2018 | Manchester Arena, Manchester England | |
| 24 | Win | 23–1 | Laszlo Hubert | KO | 2 (8), 0:20 | 16 Mar 2018 | Hallmann Dome, Vienna, Austria | |
| 23 | Win | 22–1 | Marcelo Ferreira dos Santos | KO | 5 (12), 2:59 | 1 Apr 2017 | Markthalle, Burgdorf, Switzerland | Retained WBF Inter-Continental cruiserweight title |
| 22 | Loss | 21–1 | Mahmoud Charr | UD | 10 | 17 Sep 2016 | EWS Arena, Goeppingen, Germany | For vacant WBA International heavyweight title |
| 21 | Win | 21–0 | Laszlo Hubert | TKO | 2 (12), 0:58 | 23 Apr 2016 | Markthalle, Burgdorf, Switzerland | Won vacant WBF Inter-Continental cruiserweight title |
| 20 | Win | 20–0 | Radenko Kovac | KO | 1 (6), 1:45 | 27 Jun 2015 | Sportpark Lippe, Detmold, Germany | |
| 19 | Win | 19–0 | Sasa Dajic | KO | 1 (8), 2:55 | 9 May 2015 | Hildesheim, Germany | |
| 18 | Win | 18–0 | Josef Krivka | TKO | 1 (6), 2:30 | 16 May 2014 | CU Arena, Hamburg, Germany | |
| 17 | Win | 17–0 | Josip Jalusic | TKO | 1 (6), 2:35 | 26 Apr 2014 | Atrium Sports Center, Buchs, Switzerland | |
| 16 | Win | 16–0 | Gyula Bozai | UD | 6 | 7 Oct 2012 | Boris Trajkovski Sports Arena, Skopje, North Macedonia | |
| 15 | Win | 15–0 | Marko Angermann | TKO | 6 (6), 1:48 | 11 Feb 2012 | Boxsporthalle Braamkamp, Hamburg, Germany | |
| 14 | Win | 14–0 | Josip Jalusic | TKO | 6 (8) | 15 Oct 2011 | Sporthalle Schuetzenmatt, Burgdorf, Switzerland | |
| 13 | Win | 13–0 | Gabor Zsalek | TKO | 2 (12), 1:20 | 24 Sep 2011 | Gostivar, North Macedonia | |
| 12 | Win | 12–0 | Istvan Bobis | TKO | 2 (6) | 27 Nov 2010 | Gostivar, North Macedonia | |
| 11 | Win | 11–0 | Viktor Szalai | TKO | 2 (12), 1:31 | 26 Jun 2010 | Calafatti Halle Prater, Vienna, Austria | Won vacant WBF Inter-Continental cruiserweight title |
| 10 | Win | 10–0 | Tomislav Juric Grgic | TKO | 4 (6), 0:13 | 26 Dec 2009 | Stadthalle, Vienna, Austria | |
| 9 | Win | 9–0 | Ferenc Zsalek | KO | 1 (6), 2:56 | 5 Dec 2009 | Sporthalle, Kirchberg, Switzerland | |
| 8 | Win | 8–0 | Gyorgy Mihalik | TKO | 3 (6) | 25 Jul 2009 | Salla e Sportit, Gostivar, North Macedonia | |
| 7 | Win | 7–0 | Ivica Cukusic | RTD | 4 (6), 3:00 | 18 Apr 2009 | Pallati i Rinise, Pristina, Kosovo | |
| 6 | Win | 6–0 | Roman Klucar | TKO | 2 (6), 1:15 | 20 Dec 2008 | Markthalle, Burgdorf, Switzerland | |
| 5 | Win | 5–0 | Attila Makula | TKO | 4 (6) | 28 Nov 2008 | Boris Trajkovski Sports Center, Skopje, North Macedonia | |
| 4 | Win | 4–0 | Gyorgy Mihalik | KO | 6 (6), 1:20 | 28 Jun 2008 | Markthalle, Burgdorf, Switzerland | |
| 3 | Win | 3–0 | Jonathan Pasi | TKO | 5 (6), 1:30 | 3 May 2008 | Sporthalle, Kirchberg, Switzerland | |
| 2 | Win | 2–0 | Drazen Ordulj | UD | 6 | 8 Dec 2007 | Sporthalle, Kirchberg, Switzerland | |
| 1 | Win | 1–0 | Anton Lascek | TKO | 4 (6), 0:50 | 26 May 2007 | Sporthalle, Kirchberg, Switzerland | |
