= Rob Calloway =

American boxer

Personal information
- Nationality: United States
- Born: Rob Calloway; July 18, 1969 (age 57) Hartford, Kentucky
- Height: 6 ft 2 in (1.88 m)
- Weight: Cruiserweight

Boxing career
- Stance: Orthodox

Boxing record
- Total fights: 91
- Wins: 71
- Win by KO: 57
- Losses: 14
- Draws: 2
- No contests: 4

Rob Calloway (born July 18, 1969) is an American former professional boxer who competed from 1992 to 2012.

== Amateur career ==
He had forty amateur bouts, was the Kansas City Golden Gloves champion three times, and a semifinalist for the 1992 US western Olympic trials.

== Professional career ==
His win over Bob Mirovic in Australia for the WBF heavyweight championship was designated the 2005 Fight of the Year by Fox Sports Australia.

Calloway has faced some of the world's most famous boxers including former heavyweight champion Hasim Rahman, who knocked out Calloway in two rounds.

== Personal life ==
He and his wife Robin have two children, Chase ("Kid Dynamite") Calloway and Riley ("Butter").

== Professional Boxing Record ==
91 fights	71 wins	14 losses
By knockout	57	8
By decision	14	6
By disqualification	0	0
Draws	2	
No contests	4	

Result	Record	Opponent	Type	Round	Date	Location	Notes
Loss	71-14-2; 4 NC	(Australia) Mark de Mori	TKO	4 (10)	17/03/2012	Entertainment Centre, Gladstone, Queensland, Australia	
Win	72-13-2; 4 NC	(United States) Galen Brown	TKO	4 (12)	04/11/2011	Civic Arena, Saint Joseph, Missouri, United States	For vacant NABA, WBC, & IBF Cruiserweight titles. Brown came in 14 lbs over the weight limit and was therefore ineligible to win any of the three titles at stake.
Loss	71-13-2; 4 NC	(New Zealand) Chauncy Welliver	UD	12	03/10/2011	Tianjin, China	For interim WBO Asia Pacific & vacant WBO China Zone heavyweight titles.
Win	71-12-2; 4 NC	(United States) Travis Fulton	MD	6	06/08/2010	Memorial Hall, Kansas City, Kansas, United States	
Loss	70-12-2; 4 NC	(United States) Shannon Briggs	TKO	1 (10)	28/05/2010	Norfolk Scope Arena, Norfolk, Virginia, United States	
Loss	70-11-2; 4 NC	(Poland) Paweł Kołodziej	RTD	6 (12)	18/12/2009	MOSiR Hall, Ks. Skorupki 21, Łódź, Poland	For IBC Cruiserweight title.
Win	70-10-2; 4 NC	(United States) Clinton Boldridge	TKO	5 (10)	07/11/2009	Civic Arena, Saint Joseph, Missouri, United States	
Loss	69-10-2; 4 NC	(Russia) Grigory Drozd	TKO	7 (12)	06/12/2008	Circus, Nizhny Novgorod (Gorky), Russia	For vacant WBO Asia Pacific, WBC Asian Boxing Council & PABA Cruiserweight titles. Calloway down 8 times.
Loss	69-9-2; 4 NC	(Russia) Aleksandr Alekseyev	TKO	3 (12)	27/09/2008	Color Line Arena, Altona, Hamburg, Germany	For WBO Inter-Continental Cruiserweight title.
Draw	69-8-2; 4 NC	(United States) Max Alexander	PTS	12	19/07/2008	Civic Arena, Saint Joseph, Missouri, United States	Retained WBC Continental Americas Cruiserweight title.
Win	69-8-1; 4 NC	(United States) David Robinson	TKO	2 (8)	22/05/2008	Viking Hotel Grand Ballroom, Saint Louis, Missouri, United States	
Win	68-8-1; 4 NC	(United States) Juan Carlos Robles	TKO	8 (10)	15/03/2008	Days Inn, Allentown, Pennsylvania, United States	
Win	67-8-1; 4 NC	(United States) Matt Gockel	TKO	2 (10)	23/02/2008	Civic Arena, Saint Joseph, Missouri, United States	
Win	66-8-1; 4 NC	(United States) Galen Brown	TKO	4 (12)	06/10/2007	Civic Arena, Saint Joseph, Missouri, United States	For vacant WBC Continental Americas, IBF International & NABA cruiserweight titles.
Win	65-8-1; 4 NC	(United States) Terry Smith	UD	10	10/08/2007	Expo Center, Springfield, Missouri, United States	
Win	64-8-1; 4 NC	(United States) Chris Thomas	TKO	3 (8)	30/05/2007	Barney Allis Plaza, Kansas City, Missouri, United States	
Win	63-8-1; 4 NC	(United States) Cliff Couser	TKO	2 (10)	10/05/2007	Crowne Plaza Hotel, Tulsa, Oklahoma, United States	
Win	62-8-1; 4 NC	(United States) Stacy Goodson	TKO	2 (8)	18/04/2007	(The Bahamas) Clifford Park, Nassau, Bahamas	
Win	61-8-1; 4 NC	(United States) Tyrone Roberts	TKO	3 (10)	29/03/2007	Harrah's Casino, Kansas City, Missouri, United States	
Win	60-8-1; 4 NC	(United States) Buck Smith	TKO	3 (10)	24/02/2007	Civic Arena, Saint Joseph, Missouri, United States	
Win	59-8-1; 4 NC	(United States) Doug Kaluza	KO	2 (10)	07/12/2006	Municipal Auditorium, Kansas City, Missouri, United States	
Win	58-8-1; 4 NC	(United States) Byron Polley	TKO	2 (12)	27/10/2006	Civic Arena, Saint Joseph, Missouri, United States	Won WBE Heavyweight title.
Win	57-8-1; 4 NC	(United States) David Robinson	KO	3 (10)	21/07/2006	Bricktown, Oklahoma City, United States	
Loss	56-8-1; 4 NC	(United States) Jameel McCline	UD	10	26/04/2006	Buffalo Run Casino, Miami, Oklahoma, United States	
Win	56-7-1; 4 NC	(United States) Benito Fernandez	KO	1 (10)	18/03/2006	Convention Center, Fort Smith, Arkansas, United States	
Loss	55-7-1; 4 NC	(Uzbekistan) Ruslan Chagaev	KO	2 (10)	07/01/2006	Zenith – Die Kulturhalle, Munich, Germany	
Win	55-6-1; 4 NC	(New Zealand) Richard Tutaki	TKO	2 (12)	01/10/2005	Civic Arena, Saint Joseph, Missouri, United States	Retained PABA Heavyweight title.
Win	54-6-1; 4 NC	(Australia) Bob Mirovic	UD	12	24/06/2005	Royal Pines Resort, Ashmore, Gold Coast, Queensland, Australia	Won vacant WBFo & PABA Heavyweight titles.
Win	53-6-1; 4 NC	(United States) Jim Strohl	TKO	6 (12)	14/05/2005	(United States) Delta Center, Salt Lake City, Australia	Won NABC Heavyweight title.
Win	52-6-1; 4 NC	(Brazil) Daniel Frank	KO	1 (10)	04/03/2005	Civic Arena, Saint Joseph, Missouri, United States	
Win	51-6-1; 4 NC	(United States) Travis Fulton	TKO	2 (10)	05/02/2005	Diggz Arena, Omaha, Nebraska, United States	
Win	50-6-1; 4 NC	(United States) Kerry Biles	TKO	6 (10)	26/01/2005	Ameristar Casino, Kansas City, Missouri, United States	
Win	49-6-1; 4 NC	(United States) Jeff Pegues	KO	2 (10)	03/12/2004	Municipal Auditorium, Kansas City, Missouri, United States	Pegues down twice.
Win	48-6-1; 4 NC	(United States) Andy Sample	TKO	2 (12)	29/10/2004	Civic Arena, Saint Joseph, Missouri, United States	Retained WBFo Intercontinental Heavyweight title.
Win	47-6-1; 4 NC	(United States) Kerry Biles	KO	4 (8)	08/10/2004	Lakeside Casino, Osceola, Iowa, United States	Won vacant USA Mid American Heavyweight title.
Loss	46-6-1; 4 NC	(United States) Hasim Rahman	KO	2 (10)	17/06/2004	Michael's Eighth Avenue, Glen Burnie, Maryland, United States	
Win	46-5-1; 4 NC	(United States) Jeff Ford	KO	2 (10)	26/05/2004	Ameristar Casino, Kansas City, Missouri, United States	
Win	45-5-1; 4 NC	(United States) Daniel Salcedo	KO	2 (10)	12/03/2004	Civic Arena, Saint Joseph, Missouri, United States	
Win	44-5-1; 4 NC	(United States) Jason Nicholson	TKO	3 (12)	27/12/2003	Civic Arena, Saint Joseph, Missouri, United States	Retained WBFo Intercontinental Heavyweight title.
Win	43-5-1; 4 NC	(United States) Julius Long	UD	12	18/10/2003	Civic Arena, Saint Joseph, Missouri, United States	Retained WBFo Intercontinental Heavyweight title.
Loss	42-5-1; 4 NC	(United Kingdom) Audley Harrison	TKO	5 (8)	08/02/2003	Fountain Leisure Centre, Brentford, London, United Kingdom	Fight is stopped just after the bell had sounded to start round 5 due to a broken jaw.
Draw	42-4-1; 4 NC	(Uzbekistan) Ruslan Chagaev	TD	3 (10)	05/10/2002	Cobo Hall, Detroit, United States	Fight stopped due to a Calloway cut caused by headbutt.
Win	42–4; 4 NC	(United States) Eric Davis	TKO	9 (10)	08/09/2002	Ramada Inn, Saint Joseph, Missouri, United States	
Win	41–4; 4 NC	(United States) Otis Tisdale	TKO	11 (12)	28/06/2002	Civic Arena, Saint Joseph, Missouri, United States	Won WBFo Intercontinental Heavyweight title.
Win	40–4; 4 NC	(United States) Marcus Rhode	TKO	3 (8)	26/04/2002	Saint Joseph, Missouri, United States	
Loss	39–4; 4 NC	(Denmark) Tue Bjørn Thomsen	UD	12	21/09/2001	Idraettens hus, Vejle, Denmark	For IBC Super Cruiserweight title.
Win	39–3; 4 NC	(United States) Craig Brinson	TKO	6 (6)	18/08/2001	Fairmont Hotel, Dallas, United States	
Win	38–3; 4 NC	(United States) James Tillis	TKO	9 (10)	13/04/2001	Civic Arena, Saint Joseph, Missouri, United States	
Win	37–3; 4 NC	(United States) Jason Nicholson	TKO	3 (10)	11/11/2000	Civic Arena, Saint Joseph, Missouri, United States	
Win	36–3; 4 NC	(United States) Lorenzo Boyd	TKO	6 (10)	28/07/2000	Civic Arena, Saint Joseph, Missouri, United States	
Win	35–3; 4 NC	(United States) Troy Weida	TKO	1 (12)	31/03/2000	Catfish Bend Casino, Burlington, Iowa, United States	Won vacant IBA Junior Heavyweight title.
Win	34–3; 4 NC	(United States) Dan Kosmicki	TKO	2 (8)	18/02/2000	Burlington Auditorium, Burlington, Iowa, United States	
Loss	33–3; 4 NC	(United States) Kenny Keene	UD	12	12/11/1999	Bank of America Center, Boise, Idaho, United States	For IBA Cruiserweight title.
Win	33–2; 4 NC	(United States) Donnie Penelton	UD	8	01/09/1999	St. Jo Frontier Casino, Saint Joseph, Missouri, United States	
NC	32–2; 4 NC	(United States) Dan Kosmicki	ND	6 (10)	10/07/1999	Civic Arena, Saint Joseph, Missouri, United States	Calloway won by KO in 6, promoter requested No-Decision so neither fighter would risk a loss.
Win	32–2; 3 NC	(United States) Nathaniel Miles	UD	8	23/05/1999	Harrah's Casino, Kansas City, Missouri, United States	
Win	31–2; 3 NC	(United States) Darrell Spinks	UD	12	03/04/1999	Civic Arena, Saint Joseph, Missouri, United States	Won IBA Continental Americas Cruiserweight title.
NC	30–2; 3 NC	(United States) Shawn Clarkson	ND	1 (6)	19/02/1999	Memorial Auditorium, Burlington, Iowa, United States	
Win	30–2; 2 NC	(United States) John Moore	TKO	5 (?)	16/01/1999	Horton, Kansas, United States	
Win	29–2; 2 NC	(United States) Dominick Carter	TKO	2 (?)	10/10/1998	Civic Arena, Saint Joseph, Missouri, United States	
NC	28–2; 2 NC	(United States) Jason Nicholson	ND	6	30/09/1998	Station Casino, Kansas City, Missouri, United States	Calloway won bout by decision. Commission ruled bout No-Decision.
Win	28–2; 1 NC	(United States) Lonnie Knowles	TKO	3 (10)	10/07/1998	Station Casino, Kansas City, Missouri, United States	Retained World Athletic Association Light Heavyweight title.
Win	27–2; 1 NC	(United States) Tyler Hughes	KO	8 (12)	19/05/1998	Civic Arena, Saint Joseph, Missouri, United States	Retained World Athletic Association Light Heavyweight title.
Win	26–2; 1 NC	(United States) Mike Pearman	TKO	3 (12)	10/02/1998	Civic Arena, Saint Joseph, Missouri, United States	Retained World Athletic Association Light Heavyweight title.
Win	25–2; 1 NC	(United States) Zennie Reynolds	TKO	3 (8)	12/12/1997	North Iowa Fairground, Mason City, Iowa, United States	
Win	24–2; 1 NC	(United States) Richard Wilson	TKO	2 (8)	25/10/1997	Civic Arena, Saint Joseph, Missouri, United States	Retained World Athletic Association Light Heavyweight title.
NC	23–2; 1 NC	(United States) Daniel Salcedo	ND	3 (8)	09/10/1997	Palace Theater, Altoona, Iowa, United States	
Win	23–2	(United States) Eric Davis	UD	8	08/08/1997	Station Casino, Kansas City, Missouri, United States	
Win	22–2	(United States) Tyrus Armstead	TKO	7 (8)	03/06/1997	Station Casino, Kansas City, Missouri, United States	
Win	21–2	(United States) Ray Domenge	TKO	7 (8)	02/04/1997	Station Casino, Kansas City, Missouri, United States	Won World Athletic Association Light Heavyweight title.
Win	20–2	(United States) Danny Thomas	UD	12	11/12/1996	Fireman's Local 77, Saint Joseph, Missouri, United States	
Win	19–2	(United States) Steve Langley	KO	5 (6)	27/11/1996	Beaumont Club, Kansas City, Missouri, United States	
Win	18–2	(United States) Richard Green	TKO	4 (6)	16/10/1996	Beaumont Club, Kansas City, Missouri, United States	
Win	17–2	(United States) Joe Harris	UD	6	13/09/1996	Knapp Center, Des Moines, Iowa, United States	
Win	16–2	(United States) Richard Wilson	UD	6	12/08/1996	Beaumont Club, Kansas City, Missouri, United States	
Win	15–2	(United States) Larry Fleming	TKO	2 (6)	31/07/1996	Prairie Meadows Casino, Altoona, Iowa, United States	
Win	14–2	(United States) Frank Minton	KO	3 (8)	03/06/1996	Marriott Allis Plaza Hotel, Kansas City, Missouri, United States	
Win	13–2	(United States) Zennie Reynolds	TKO	5 (8)	24/04/1996	Fireman's Local 77, Saint Joseph, Missouri, United States	
Win	12–2	(United States) Randy McGaugh	TKO	5 (5)	15/01/1996	Beaumont Club, Kansas City, Missouri, United States	
Win	11–2	(United States) Vance Winn	UD	6	26/08/1995	Argosy Riverboat, Kansas City, Missouri, United States	
Win	10–2	(United States) Carlos Vásquez	TKO	3 (6)	11/05/1995	Marriott Allis Plaza Hotel, Kansas City, Missouri, United States	
Win	9–2	(United States) Kevin Cloughlay	TKO	4 (6)	13/02/1995	Marriott Allis Plaza Hotel, Kansas City, Missouri, United States	
Loss	8–2	(United States) Roman Santos	PTS	5	25/08/1994	Las Vegas, United States	
Win	8–1	(United States) Carlos Vásquez	TKO	5 (?)	25/05/1994	Civic Arena, Saint Joseph, Missouri, United States	
Win	7–1	(United States) Derrick Edwards	TKO	2 (6)	21/04/1994	Las Vegas, United States	
Win	6–1	(United States) Willie Jackson	KO	1 (?)	10/02/1994	Saint Joseph, Missouri, United States	
Loss	5–1	(United States) Ken McCurdy	SD	6	23/10/1993	Civic Arena, Saint Joseph, Missouri, United States	Although listed as a points win for Calloway in the 1994 American Boxing Record Book, the day-after Kansas City Star reports a split decision win for McCurdy.
Win	5–0	(United States) Larry McFadden	KO	1 (6)	23/08/1993	Civic Arena, Saint Joseph, Missouri, United States	
Win	4–0	(United States) Rodney Coe	PTS	4	25/06/1993	St. Louis, Missouri, United States	
Win	3–0	(United States) Aaron Platt	KO	1 (?)	25/06/1993	St. Louis, Missouri, United States	
Win	2–0	(United States) Ron Jackson	KO	1 (4)	17/01/1993	Hyatt Regency Ballroom, St. Louis, Missouri, United States	
Win	1–0	(United States) Kenny Brown	PTS	4	24/10/1992	Wichita, Kansas, United States	Pro debut for Calloway
