= Steve Hérélius =

French boxer (born 1976)

Personal information
- Nickname: Centurion
- Born: Steve Antole Severin Hérélius; July 15, 1976 (age 49) Paris, France
- Height: 6 ft 1 1/2 in (187 cm)
- Weight: Cruiserweight; Heavyweight

Boxing career
- Reach: 81 in (206 cm)
- Stance: Southpaw

Boxing record
- Total fights: 27
- Wins: 21
- Win by KO: 12
- Losses: 5
- Draws: 1

Steve Hérélius (born 15 July 1976) is a French former professional boxer who competed from 2002 to 2013 and held the WBA interim cruiserweight title from 2010 to 2011.

== Professional career ==
Nicknamed Centurion, Hérélius turned pro in 2002 and after winning his first fourteen fights fought veteran heavyweight Albert Sosnowski in 2007 and lost via TKO. After fighting mainly journeyman opposition he positioned himself to challenge Firat Arslan for the vacant WBA interim Cruiserweight belt. Arslan was coming into the bout after an extended absence, and was unable to continue after taking a hard uppercut from Herelius at the end of the 11th round. On 12 February 2011, Hérélius lost the WBA interim Cruiserweight belt to Yoan Pablo Hernández by knockout of the 7th round.

== Bare-knuckle boxing ==
In his third bout with Bare Knuckle Fighting Championship, Hérélius faced Leonardo Perdomo on 27 March 2025 at BKFC 70 and lost by knockout 13 seconds into the first round.

== Professional boxing record ==
27 fights	21 wins	5 losses
By knockout	12	4
By decision	9	0
By disqualification	0	1
Draws	1	

No.	Result	Record	Opponent	Type	Round, time	Date	Location	Notes
27	Loss	21–5–1	Nuri Seferi	DQ	7 (10), 0:58	20 Dec 2013	Messe, Schnelsen, Germany	Hérélius disqualified for hitting during a break
26	Loss	21–4–1	Santander Silgado	TKO	2 (10), 2:10	1 Nov 2013	Coliseo Bernardo Caraballo, Cartagena, Colombia	For vacant WBC Latino cruiserweight title
25	Loss	21–3–1	Dmytro Kucher	KO	2 (12), 1:30	27 Oct 2012	Club Sportlife, Kyiv, Ukraine	For WBC Silver International cruiserweight title
24	Loss	21–2–1	Yoan Pablo Hernández	KO	7 (12), 1:19	12 Feb 2011	RWE Rhein-Ruhr Sporthalle, Mülheim, Germany	Lost WBA interim cruiserweight title
23	Win	21–1–1	Roman Kracik	UD	8	30 Oct 2010	Palais des Sports, Paris, France	
22	Win	20–1–1	Firat Arslan	RTD	11 (12), 3:00	3 Jul 2010	Porsche-Arena, Stuttgart, Germany	Won vacant WBA interim cruiserweight title
21	Win	19–1–1	Lubos Suda	UD	8	24 Oct 2009	La Palestre, Le Cannet, France	
20	Win	18–1–1	Jean Marc Monrose	TD	6 (12)	27 Jun 2009	La Palestre, Le Cannet, France	Won vacant WBA Inter-Continental cruiserweight title
19	Win	17–1–1	Tomas Mrazek	PTS	6	10 Apr 2009	Salle Yaris, Noisy-le-Grand, France	
18	Win	16–1–1	Jean Marc Monrose	MD	10	5 Mar 2009	Cirque d'Hiver, Paris, France	
17	Win	15–1–1	Andrey Zaitsev	RTD	5 (6)	5 Jun 2008	Cirque d'hiver, Paris, France	
16	Draw	14–1–1	Zine Eddine Benmakhlouf	PTS	8	30 Oct 2007	Centre Omnisports, Massy, France	
15	Loss	14–1	Albert Sosnowski	TKO	9 (10), 2:18	8 Jun 2007	Civic Centre, Motherwell, Scotland	
14	Win	14–0	Suren Kalachyan	TKO	2 (8)	20 Mar 2007	Salle la Soucoupe, Saint-Nazaire, France	
13	Win	13–0	Ghuslain Kiabella	TKO	2 (8)	30 Jan 2007	Salle Leo Lagrange, Pont-Sainte-Maxence, France	
12	Win	12–0	Wallace McDaniel	KO	3 (6), 2:02	5 Jan 2007	DeSoto Civic Center, Southaven, Mississippi, U.S.	
11	Win	11–0	Innocent Otukwu	TKO	2 (6), 0:27	28 Jul 2006	PFTC Sports Center, Las Vegas, Nevada, U.S.	
10	Win	10–0	Vlado Szabo	KO	4 (6)	18 Jul 2006	Paris, France	
9	Win	9–0	Zoltan Petranyi	TKO	2 (8)	17 Jun 2006	Bondy, France	
8	Win	8–0	Bertrand Tietsia	PTS	8	13 May 2006	Sfax, Tunisia	
7	Win	7–0	Bruce Oezbek	TKO	4 (8)	26 Mar 2005	Besançon, France	
6	Win	6–0	Thierry Guezouli	TKO	4 (10)	30 Oct 2004	Fort-de-France, France	Retained French heavyweight title
5	Win	5–0	Thierry Guezouli	TKO	3 (10)	29 Apr 2004	Palais des sports Marcel-Cerdan, Levallois-Perret, France	Retained French heavyweight title
4	Win	4–0	Antoine Palatis	UD	10	20 Dec 2003	Gymnasium des Yvris, Noisy-le-Grand, France	Won vacant French heavyweight title
3	Win	3–0	Nino Fiumana	PTS	6	11 Feb 2003	Pentagono, Bormio, Italy	
2	Win	2–0	Alain Martin	TKO	1 (6)	29 Nov 2002	Pointe-à-Pitre, France	
1	Win	1–0	Ken Sharpe	PTS	6	10 May 2002	Cayenne, France	

== Bare knuckle record ==
Professional record breakdown
3 matches	1 win	2 losses
By knockout	0	2
By decision	1	0

Res.	Record	Opponent	Method	Event	Date	Round	Time	Location	Notes
Loss	1–2	Leonardo Perdomo	KO	BKFC 70	March 27, 2025	1	0:13	Hollywood, Florida, United States	
Loss	1–1	Josh Copeland	TKO	BKFC 50	September 22, 2023	3	1:43	Denver Colorado, United States	
Win	1–0	Juan Torres	Decision (split)	BKFC 18	June 26, 2021	5	2:00	Hollywood, Florida, United States	

== See also ==
- List of southpaw stance boxers

Sporting positions
Regional boxing titles
Vacant Title last held by Cyril Seror	French heavyweight champion 20 December 2003 – 2005; Vacated	Vacant Title next held by Grégory Tony
Vacant Title last held by Johny Jensen	WBA Inter-Continental cruiserweight champion 27 June 2009 – 3 July 2010; Won interim title	Vacant Title next held by Iago Kiladze
World boxing titles
Vacant Title last held by Firat Arslan	WBA cruiserweight champion Interim title 3 July 2010 – 12 February 2011	Succeeded by Yoan Pablo Hernández
