= Richard Hall (boxer) =

Jamaican boxer

Richard I. Hall
Personal information
- Nickname: The Destroyer
- Born: 25 October 1971 (age 55) Kingston, Jamaica
- Height: 6 ft 3 in (191 cm)
- Weight: Light heavyweight; Cruiserweight

Boxing career
- Reach: 78 in (198 cm)
- Stance: Southpaw

Boxing record
- Total fights: 44
- Wins: 30
- Win by KO: 28
- Losses: 14

Richard Hall (born 25 October 1971) Jamaican former professional boxer who competed from 1993 to 2013. He held the interim WBA light heavyweight title, and challenged for world titles three times.

== Career ==
Hall won the interim World Boxing Association light heavyweight title against Anthony Bigeni and lost other world title bids against Roy Jones Jr. and Dariusz Michalczewski (twice).

Hall has also fought Byron Mitchell, Denton Daley and O'Neil Bell.

== Professional boxing record ==
44 fights	30 wins	14 losses
By knockout	28	8
By decision	2	6

No.	Result	Record	Opponent	Type	Round, time	Date	Location	Notes
44	Loss	30–14	Krzysztof Głowacki	RTD	3 (8)	19 Oct 2013	Kopalnia Soli, Wieliczka, Poland	
43	Loss	30–13	Paweł Kołodziej	UD	8	20 Apr 2013	Hala Podpromie, Rzeszów, Poland	
42	Loss	30–12	Denton Daley	UD	10	4 Mar 2013	Ritz Carlton, Toronto, Ontario, Canada	For vacant NABF cruiserweight title
41	Loss	30–11	Isiah Thomas	UD	10	30 Nov 2012	BB&T Center, Sunrise, Florida, U.S.	For vacant interim WBA Fedelatin cruiserweight title
40	Loss	30–10	Umberto Savigne	TKO	6 (10), 2:47	18 May 2012	Seminole Hard Rock Hotel and Casino, Hollywood, Florida, U.S.	For vacant WBA Fedelatin light heavyweight title
39	Loss	30–9	Grigory Drozd	RTD	8 (10), 3:00	8 Feb 2012	Krylia Sovetov, Moscow, Russia	
38	Win	30–8	O'Neil Bell	TKO	2 (10), 1:58	4 Jun 2011	Seminole Hard Rock Hotel and Casino, Hollywood, Florida, U.S.	
37	Loss	29–8	Yordanis Despaigne	UD	10	7 May 2010	Isleta Casino & Resort, Albuquerque, New Mexico, U.S.	
36	Win	29–7	Jaffa Ballogou	KO	1 (10), 0:20	27 Feb 2010	Electricians Union Hall, Miami, Florida, U.S.	Won vacant WBA Fedelatin light heavyweight title
35	Win	28–7	Byron Mitchell	TKO	4 (8), 2:15	21 Nov 2007	Sheraton Miami Mart Hotel, Miami, Florida, U.S.	
34	Loss	27–7	Shaun George	UD	8	18 May 2007	Million Dollar Elm Casino, Tulsa, Oklahoma, U.S.	
33	Loss	27–6	Glen Johnson	UD	12	24 Feb 2006	Seminole Hard Rock Hotel and Casino, Hollywood, Florida, U.S.	For vacant IBA light heavyweight title
32	Loss	27–5	Rico Hoye	KO	4 (12), 1:10	15 May 2004	Mandalay Bay Resort & Casino, Paradise, Nevada, U.S.	
31	Win	27–4	Rodney Moore	UD	10	6 Nov 2003	Hilton Hotel, Washington, D.C., U.S.	
30	Win	26–4	Julian Letterlough	TKO	2 (10), 0:47	18 July 2003	Cape Cod Melody Tent, Hyannis, Massachusetts, U.S.	
29	Loss	25–4	Dariusz Michalczewski	TKO	10 (12)	14 Sep 2002	Volkswagen Halle, Braunschweig, Germany	For WBO and lineal light-heavyweight titles
28	Loss	25–3	Dariusz Michalczewski	TKO	11 (12), 1:50	15 Dec 2001	Estrel Hotel, Berlin, Germany	For WBO and lineal light-heavyweight titles
27	Win	25–2	Anthony Spain	TKO	1 (8), 2:52	28 July 2001	Exhibition Hall, Fort Myers, Florida, U.S.	
26	Loss	24–2	Roy Jones Jr.	TKO	11 (12), 1:41	13 May 2000	Conseco Fieldhouse, Indianapolis, Indiana, U.S.	For WBA, WBC, and IBF light heavyweight titles
25	Win	24–1	Fabian Garcia	TKO	2 (10)	12 Jun 1999	Shriners Auditorium, Wilmington, Massachusetts, U.S.	
24	Win	23–1	Anthony Bigeni	TKO	3 (12), 1:18	5 Dec 1998	Convention Center, Atlantic City, New Jersey, U.S.	Won interim WBA light heavyweight title
23	Win	22–1	Gary Ballard	TKO	3 (10), 2:38	30 Apr 1998	The Chili Pepper, Fort Lauderdale, Florida, U.S.	
22	Win	21–1	Karl Willis	TKO	3 (10)	20 Dec 1997	Club Grand Slam, Miami, Florida, U.S.	
21	Win	20–1	Joe Harris	TKO	2 (6)	7 Oct 1997	Nashville, Tennessee, U.S.	
20	Win	19–1	Mark Peters	TKO	7 (8)	21 Jun 1997	Sun Dome, Tampa, Florida, U.S.	
19	Win	18–1	Eric Rhinehart	KO	2 (?)	10 Dec 1996	Bubba N' Buck's, Columbia, South Carolina, U.S.	
18	Loss	17–1	Rocky Gannon	TKO	10 (12), 1:55	4 Jun 1996	Arizona Charlie's, Las Vegas, Nevada, U.S.	For vacant IBC light heavyweight title
17	Win	17–0	Jose Hiram Torres	KO	1 (6)	13 Apr 1996	Fleet Center, Boston, Massachusetts, U.S.	
16	Win	16–0	Ken McCurdy	TKO	2 (8)	2 Feb 1996	Boulder Station, Sunrise Manor, Nevada, U.S.	
15	Win	15–0	Kevin Whaley El	TKO	4 (10)	15 Jan 1996	Landmark Inn, Woodbridge, New Jersey, U.S.	
14	Win	14–0	Calvin Combs	TKO	2 (6)	4 Nov 1995	Caesars Palace, Paradise, Nevada, U.S.	
13	Win	13–0	Kertis Mingo	TKO	4 (?)	11 Oct 1995	International Ballroom, Washington, D.C., U.S.	
12	Win	12–0	Sherman Brown	TKO	2 (6)	29 Sep 1995	Buffalo Bill's, Stateline, Nevada, U.S.	
11	Win	11–0	Barry Tolbert	KO	5 (6)	3 Aug 1995	Silver Nugget, North Las Vegas, Nevada, U.S.	
10	Win	10–0	Robert Britt	TKO	1 (4)	17 Jun 1995	MGM Grand Garden Arena, Las Vegas, Nevada, U.S.	
9	Win	9–0	Juan Hunter	PTS	6 (6)	25 May 1995	Michael's Eighth Avenue, Glen Burnie, Maryland, U.S.	
8	Win	8–0	Willie Driver	KO	3 (6)	25 Mar 1995	Seville Beach Hotel, Miami Beach, Florida, U.S.	
7	Win	7–0	Francisco Pena	KO	1 (?)	27 Jan 1995	Seville Beach Hotel, Miami Beach, Florida, U.S.	
6	Win	6–0	Willie Dollard	TKO	3 (?)	20 May 1994	Charlotte Memorial Auditorium, Punta Gorda, Florida, U.S.	
5	Win	5–0	Keith Brunck	TKO	2 (?)	10 Mar 1994	Park Plaza Hotel, Hialeah, Florida, U.S.	
4	Win	4–0	Mark Buchannon	TKO	4 (8)	4 Jan 1994	War Memorial Auditorium, Fort Lauderdale, Florida, U.S.	
3	Win	3–0	Willie Driver	KO	4 (4)	13 Aug 1993	Winter Haven, Florida, U.S.	
2	Win	2–0	Louis Gallucci	KO	3 (4)	2 Jul 1993	Daytona Beach, Florida, U.S.	
1	Win	1–0	Francisco Harris	KO	2 (4)	25 Jun 1993	Orange Dome, Winter Haven, Florida, U.S.	

== See also ==
- List of southpaw stance boxers

Achievements
New title	WBA light heavyweight champion Interim title 5 December 1998 – 13 May 2000; Lost bid for full title	Vacant Title next held by Silvio Branco
