= Nuri Seferi =

Albanian boxer

Personal information
- Nickname: Albanian Tyson
- Nationality: Albanian
- Born: 23 December 1976 (age 49) Gostivar, SR Macedonia, SFR Yugoslavia
- Height: 5 ft 11 in (1.80 m)
- Weight: Cruiserweight; Heavyweight

Boxing career
- Stance: Orthodox

Boxing record
- Total fights: 53
- Wins: 42
- Win by KO: 24
- Losses: 11
- Draws: 0

Nuri Seferi (born 23 December 1976) is an Albanian professional boxer who competes out of Burgdorf, Switzerland.

== Biography ==
Seferi was born in Gostivar, SR Macedonia, SFR Yugoslavia (present-day North Macedonia) and is of Albanian heritage. Whilst in Yugoslavia as an eight-year-old he started wrestling, a sport which his grandfather had competed in professionally. In 1992 his family fled from Gostivar and moved to Burgdorf, Switzerland. Seferi found it hard to adapt to the lifestyle and language change, and as he was 15 at the time he was too old for compulsory education. He took up boxing in order to help with integration into Swiss society. He began to train under the guidance of trainer Sandor Konya at a local gym in Burgdorf, but he also trained with legendary Swiss martial artist and kickboxer Andy Hug as well.

== Amateur career ==
With a perfect record of 10 wins with 9 knockouts as an amateur, Seferi became the Swiss amateur heavyweight champion in 1998. Shortly after winning the title however he began to focus on turning professional and retired a successful amateur career undefeated.

== Professional ==
He made his professional debut on 31 March 1999 against Slovak Miroslav Dzurenda in Worb, Switzerland. The 22-year-old Seferi won the fight by a knockout in the first round. his first defeat came on 16 June 2001 to Ukrainian Kostyantyn Okhrey, with Seferi being unable to continue in the 4th round due to a rib injury. Of his first 10 wins in 6 round bouts, all were won by knockouts in the first 4 rounds, with 6 knockouts coming in the opening rounds.

On 7 July 2012 Seferi made his comeback fight following his operation against Giulian Ilie in Bern, Switzerland before the Wladimir Klitschko v Tony Thompson bout. Seferi started the fight poorly, getting outfoxed and unable to match Ilie's speed. However, he gained momentum in the latter rounds and knocked down his opponent in the sixth and eighth round respectively to win on points over the 8 rounds.

He fought Steve Herelius on 7 December 2013. Seferi dominated the fight, but his opponent got disqualified in the 7th round.

He was defeated by Krzysztof Glowacki in January 2015.

He won the WBO European Cruiserweight title on 26 June 2010 and defended his title successfully four times until losing to Krzysztof Głowacki on 31 January 2015. His most recent fight was against German boxer Mahmoud Charr on December 21, 2022, which he lost via 2nd round TKO. He has fought well-known boxers like Nenad Stankovic, Gusmyr Perdomo, Douglas Otieno Okola, and Giulian Ilie.

== Personal life ==
He has a younger brother, Sefer Seferi who is also a professional boxer in the cruiserweight division. In December 2011, Nuri and his brother Sefer were named honorary citizens of their birthplace, Gostivar in Macedonia by the city's mayor Rufi Osmani.

== Professional boxing record ==
42 Wins (24 knockouts, 18 decisions), 11 Losses (3 knockout, 8 decisions),
Result	Record	Opponent	Type	Round	Date	Location	Notes
Loss	42-11	(Germany) Mahmoud Charr	TKO	2 (10)	2022-12-21	Hamburg, Germany	
Win	42-10	(Hungary) Tamás Laska	KO	2 (8)	2022-07-02	Bad Wildungen, Germany	
Loss	41-10	(Russia) Murat Gassiev	TKO	1 (10)	2020-10-31	WoW Arena, Krasnaya Polyana, Russia	
Win	41-9	(Germany) Mazen Girke	TKO	5 (6)	2020-01-18	Edel-optics.de Arena, Hamburg, Germany	
Win	40-9	(Germany) Rad Rashid	MD	8	2019-05-25	Kirchberg, Switzerland	
Loss	39-9	(Gabon) Taylor Mabika	UD	12	2018-06-08	Libreville, Gabon	
Win	39-8	(Georgia (country)) Gogita Gorgiladze	UD	8	2017-12-22	Sporthalle, Hamburg	
Win	38-8	(Hungary) László Hubert	KO	3 (8)	2017-04-01	Burgdorf, Switzerland	
Loss	37-8	(Turkey) Firat Arslan	UD	12	2016-09-27	Stuttgart, Germany	IBO Cruiserweight title eliminator. For vacant WBO European Cruiserweight title.
Win	37-7	(Serbia) Dušan Krstin	TKO	6 (8)	2016-05-21	Burgdorf, Switzerland	
Loss	36-7	(Poland) Krzysztof Głowacki	UD	12	2015-01-31	Toruń, Poland	WBO Cruiserweight title eliminator. Lost WBO European Cruiserweight title.
Win	36-6	(Hungary) Tamás Lődi	UD	12	2014-05-16	Berlin, Germany	Retained WBO European Cruiserweight title.
Win	35-6	(Venezuela) Gusmyr Perdomo	MD	8	2014-04-11	Berlin, Germany	
Win	34-6	(France) Steve Herelius	DQ	7 (10)	2013-12-20	Hamburg, Germany	
Win	33-6	(Serbia) Nenad Stankovic	TKO	1 (12)	2012-10-07	Skopje, Macedonia	Retained WBO European Cruiserweight title.
Win	32-6	(Romania) Giulian Ilie	MD	8	2012-07-07	Bern, Switzerland	
Win	31-6	(Belgium) Tony Ingelrest	TKO	3 (12)	2011-09-24	Gostivar, Macedonia	Retained WBO European Cruiserweight title.
Win	30-6	(Hungary) Jozsef Nagy	UD	8	2011-03-19	Nordrhein-Westfalen, Germany	
Win	29-6	(Kenya) Douglas Otieno Okola	UD	12	2010-11-27	Gostivar, Macedonia	Retained WBO European Cruiserweight title.
Win	28-6	(Georgia (country)) Sandro Siproshvili	UD	12	2010-06-26	Vienna, Austria	Won Vacant WBO European Cruiserweight title.
Win	27-6	(Republic of the Congo) Jonathan Pasi	UD	6	2010-06-05	Niedersachsen, Germany	
Win	26-6	(Hungary) Tamás Polster	TKO	5 (12)	2009-12-26	Vienna, Austria	Won interim WBC Mediterranean cruiserweight title.
Win	25-6	(Tanzania) Joseph Marwa	UD	4	2009-12-12	Bern, Switzerland	
Win	24-6	(Hungary) Tamás Polster	KO	2 (8)	2009-07-25	Vienna, Austria	
Win	23-6	(Slovakia) Vladimír Idranyi	UD	6	2008-12-20	Burgdorf, Switzerland	
Win	22-6	(Germany) Muhammad Ali Durmaz	TKO	2 (8)	2008-11-28	Skopje, Macedonia	
Loss	21-6	(United Kingdom) Herbie Hide	UD	12	2008-07-04	Ankara, Turkey	WBC International cruiserweight title.
Win	21-5	(Croatia) Josip Jalušić	UD	12	2008-05-03	Kirchberg, Switzerland	Interim Global Boxing Union cruiserweight title.
Win	20-5	(Croatia) Josip Jalušić	UD	12	2007-12-08	Kirchberg, Switzerland	Interim Global Boxing Union cruiserweight title.
Win	19-5	(Slovakia) Roman Klučar	TKO	2 (8)	2007-05-26	Kirchberg, Switzerland	
Win	18-5	(Croatia) Siniša Puljak	TKO	5 (8)	2007-01-20	Basel, Switzerland	
Win	17-5	(Romania) Florin Chidici	TKO	3 (8)	2006-09-16	Montreux, Switzerland	
Loss	16-5	(Germany) Marco Huck	UD	10	2006-06-03	Niedersachsen, Germany	Seferi received point deduction in 4th round for attacking with head.
Loss	16-4	(Russia) Nikolay Popov	UD	12	2006-04-26	Moscow, Russia	vacant WBO Asia Pacific cruiserweight title.
Win	16-3	(North Macedonia) Sasha Mitreski	TKO	6 (8)	2005-12-26	Bern, Switzerland	
Loss	15-3	(Ukraine) Taras Bydenko	UD	10	2005-09-28	Hamburg, Germany	German International heavyweight title.
Win	15-2	(Belarus) Ihar Shukala	TKO	3 (8)	2005-05-21	Baden, Switzerland	
Win	14-2	(Poland) Lukasz Rusiewicz	UD	8	2005-02-26	Burgdorf, Switzerland	
Loss	13-2	(Russia) Denis Bakhtov	UD	10	2005-02-11	Saint Petersburg, Russia	
Win	13-1	(Poland) Andrzej Witkowski	UD	8	2004-09-25	Burgdorf, Switzerland	
Win	12-1	(Turkey) Bruce Oezbek	UD	8	2004-06-12	Bern, Switzerland	
Win	11-1	(Russia) Muslim Biarslanov	SD	8	2003-06-09	Bern, Switzerland	
Win	10-1	(Germany) Mario Stein	TKO	1 (6)	2002-09-28	Stadthalle, Germany	
Win	9-1	(Czech Republic) Rudolf Murko	TKO	1 (6)	2002-05-20	Bern, Switzerland	
Loss	8-1	(Ukraine) Kostyantyn Okhrey	TKO	4 (6)	2001-06-16	Burgdorf, Switzerland	Seferi couldn't continue due to a rib-injury.
Win	8-0	(Romania) Mihail Gorgoiu	KO	1 (6)	2001-05-12	St. Gallen, Switzerland	
Win	7-0	(Croatia) Velimir Listes	KO	1 (6)	2000-12-09	Burgdorf, Switzerland	
Win	6-0	(Slovakia) Stefan Cirok	TKO	2 (6)	2000-08-28	Bern, Switzerland	
Win	5-0	(Slovakia) Julius Gal	TKO	3 (6)	2000-05-20	Burgdorf, Switzerland	
Win	4-0	(Germany) Steffen Holtz	KO	4 (6)	2000-03-17	Stuttgart, Germany	
Win	3-0	(Hungary) Richard Raffesberger	TKO	3 (6)	1999-03-10	Winterthur, Switzerland	
Win	2-0	(Slovakia) František Pacalaj	TKO	1 (6)	1999-05-22	Burgdorf, Switzerland	
Win	1-0	(Slovakia) Miroslav Dzurenda	KO	1 (6)	1999-03-31	Worb, Switzerland	
