= Denton Daley =

Canadian boxer

Personal information
- Nicknames: Dangerous; Brampton Bomber
- Born: March 18, 1982 (age 44) Brampton, Ontario, Canada
- Height: 6 ft 2 in (188 cm)
- Weight: Cruiserweight

Boxing career
- Reach: 63 in (160 cm)
- Stance: Orthodox

Boxing record
- Total fights: 19
- Wins: 17
- Win by KO: 10
- Losses: 2

Denton Eric Daley (born March 18, 1982) is a Canadian former professional boxer who competed from 2010 to 2017. He challenged for the WBA interim cruiserweight title in 2014 and at regional level held the WBC-NABF, Canadian, and Commonwealth cruiserweight titles between 2013 and 2016.

== Early career ==
Daley, also known as the "Brampton Bomber" won 26 amateur fights before turning pro while running his own businesses.

== Professional career ==
Daley won the North American Boxing Federation cruiserweight title by defeating Richard Hall.

Denton defeated Jean Marc Monrose to retain the WBA-NABA Cruiserweight Title.

Daley lost to Youri Kayembre Kalenga for the interim World Boxing Association cruiserweight title.

In 2016, Denton defeated Sylvera Louis winning the NCC cruiserweight and the vacant Commonwealth cruiserweight titles, Daley became the second Canadian to win the Commonwealth cruiserweight title with the first being Troy Ross when he won it in 2007.

== Championships and accomplishments ==
- National Championship of Canada
  - NCC Cruiserweight Championship (One time)
- Commonwealth Boxing Council
  - Commonwealth Cruiserweight Championship (One time)
- North American Boxing Federation
  - NABF Cruiserweight Championship (One time)
- World Boxing Association/North American Boxing Association
  - WBA-NABA Cruiserweight Championship (One time)

== Professional boxing record ==
19 fights	17 wins	2 losses
By knockout	10	2
By decision	7	0

No.	Result	Record	Opponent	Method	Round, time	Date	Location	Notes
19	Loss	17–2	(Russia) Maxim Vlasov	TKO	9 (12), 0:48	Sep 7, 2017	Kristall Ice Sports Palace, Saratov, Russia	For vacant WBA Continental cruiserweight title
18	Win	17–1	(Mexico) Felipe Romero	RTD	4 (8), 3:00	Jun 30, 2017	Hotel Holiday Inn, Durango City, Mexico	
17	Win	16–1	(Canada) Sylvera Louis	KO	9 (12), 2:47	Sep 9, 2016	(Canada) Masonic Temple, Toronto, Ontario	Won NCC and vacant Commonwealth cruiserweight titles
16	Win	15–1	(Argentina) Aljendro Emilio Valori	TKO	4 (8), 1:09	April 22, 2016	St Lawrence Centre for the Arts, Toronto, Ontario, Canada	
15	Win	14–1	(Romania) Lulian Ilie	KO	2 (10), 1:25	Aug 29, 2015	Hershey Centre, Mississauga, Ontario, Canada	
14	Win	13–1	(Argentina) Walter David Cabral	UD	8	May 9, 2015	17 Steakhouse, Mississauga, Ontario, Canada	
13	Loss	12–1	(Democratic Republic of the Congo) Youri Kalenga	TKO	12 (12), 1:52	Nov 15, 2014	Hershey Centre, Mississauga, Ontario, Canada	For WBA interim cruiserweight title
12	Win	12–0	(United States) Andreas Taylor	UD	12	Feb 15, 2014	Hershey Centre, Mississauga, Ontario, Canada	Retained WBA-NABA cruiserweight title
11	Win	11–0	(France) Jean Marc Monrose	UD	10	Sep 14, 2013	Casino Rama, Rama, Ontario, Canada	Retained WBA-NABA cruiserweight title
10	Win	10–0	(France) Faisal Ibnel Arrami	RTD	4 (10), 3:00	Jun 1, 2013	Hershey Centre, Mississauga, Ontario, Canada	Won vacant WBA-NABA cruiserweight title
9	Win	9–0	(Jamaica) Richard Hall	UD	10	Mar 4, 2013	Ritz Carlton, Toronto, Ontario, Canada	Won vacant WBC-NABF cruiserweight title
8	Win	8–0	(Argentina) Mauro Adrian Ordiales	TKO	2 (8), 0:30	Dec 1, 2012	Hershey Centre, Mississauga, Ontario, Canada	
7	Win	7–0	(Canada) Jason Douglas	TKO	4 (8), 2:35	Sep 8, 2012	Hershey Centre, Mississauga, Ontario, Canada	
6	Win	6–0	(Canada) Frank White	RTD	6 (8), 3:00	May 12, 2012	Hershey Centre, Mississauga, Ontario, Canada	
5	Win	5–0	(Mexico) Benito Quiroz	UD	6	Feb 11, 2012	Hershey Centre, Mississauga, Ontario, Canada	
4	Win	4–0	(Canada) Taylor Bull	TKO	2 (4), 1:55	Feb 4, 2011	Molson Centre, Barrie, Ontario, Canada	
3	Win	3–0	(Democratic Republic of the Congo) Pasteur Mbuyi	UD	4	Jul 10, 2010	Hershey Centre, Mississauga, Ontario, Canada	
2	Win	2–0	(Canada) Taffo Asongwed	UD	4	May 15, 2010	Powerade Centre, Brampton, Ontario, Canada	
1	Win	1–0	(Canada) Irving Chestnut	KO	3 (4), 1:17	Jan 16, 2010	Hershey Centre, Mississauga, Ontario, Canada	
