= Jean Marc Monrose =

French boxer

Jean Marc Monrose (born 4 August 1981) is a French boxer that has fought at cruiserweight. Monrose was the European Boxing Union cruiserweight champion, but lost his title to Marco Huck.

Monrose has also fought former UFC fighter Alessio Sakara, Steve Hérélius (twice) and Denton Daley.

== Professional boxing record ==
36 fights	27 wins	9 losses
By knockout	18	2
By decision	8	7
By disqualification	1	0

No.	Result	Record	Opponent	Type	Round, time	Date	Location	Notes
36	Loss	27–9	Zsolt Bogdán	UD	10	22 May 2015	Messzi István Sporthall, Kecskemét, Hungary	For vacant Hungarian heavyweight title
35	Loss	27–8	Engin Karakaplan	UD	10	6 Jun 2014	Palais des sports Marcel-Cerdan, Paris, France	Lost French cruiserweight title
34	Win	27–7	Christophe Dettinger	TKO	2 (10)	6 Dec 2013	Centre Omnisports, Massy, France	Won vacant French cruiserweight title
33	Loss	26–7	Denton Daley	UD	10	14 Sep 2013	Casino Rama, Rama, Canada	For WBA-NABA cruiserweight title
32	Win	26–6	Pavlo Nechyporenko	TKO	1 (6)	23 Jun 2013	Salle du casino, Hyères, France	
31	Loss	25–6	Grigory Drozd	UD	12	17 Dec 2012	Crocus City Hall, Krasnogorsk, Russia	For vacant WBA International cruiserweight title
30	Win	25–5	Adel Belhachemi	PTS	6	15 Jun 2012	Salle Jean Roure, Les Pennes-Mirabeau, Frabce	
29	Loss	24–5	Zine Eddine Benmakhlouf	PTS	6	30 Apr 2010	Le Dôme de Marseille, Marseille, France	
28	Loss	24–4	Steve Hérélius	TD	6 (12)	27 Jun 2009	La Palestre, Le Cannet, France	For vacant WBA Inter-Continental cruiserweight title; 1/2 finale mondiale WBA; Unanimous TD after an injury
27	Loss	24–3	Steve Hérélius	MD	10	5 Mar 2009	Cirque d'hiver, Paris, France	
26	Loss	24–2	Marco Huck	TKO	12 (12), 1:17	20 Sep 2008	Seidensticker Halle, Bielefeld, Germany	Lost European cruiserweight title
25	Win	24–1	Johny Jensen	TKO	1 (12), 1:30	3 May 2008	Palais des Sports, Marseille, France	Won European cruiserweight title
24	Win	23–1	Marco Heinichen	TKO	1 (8)	8 Mar 2008	Palais des sports St Symphorien, Metz, France	
23	Win	22–1	Zoltán Pető	TKO	3 (6)	8 Feb 2008	Salle des fetes, Melun, France	
22	Win	21–1	Martial Bella Oleme	UD	6	8 Dec 2007	La Palestre, Le Cannet, France	
21	Win	20–1	Amar Mancer	TKO	4 (8)	29 Jun 2007	Palais des Sports, Marseille, France	
20	Win	19–1	Jindřich Velecký	TKO	4 (8), 3:00	11 May 2007	Salle Vallier, Marseille, France	
19	Iin	18–1	Jindřich Velecký	RTD	5 (8)	9 Mar 2007	Palais des Sports, Lamentin, France	
18	Win	17–1	Aime Bafounta	TKO	2 (6)	2 Dec 2006	Palais Omnisport de Paris-Bercy, Paris, France	
17	Win	16–1	Aime Bafounta	UD	8	15 Jul 2006	La Palestre, Le Cannet, France	
16	Win	15–1	Kamel Amrane	UD	10	1 Jun 2006	Salle Vallier, Marseille, France	Won French cruiserweight title
15	Win	14–1	Zoltán Béres	DQ	4 (6)	15 Apr 2006	Uzès, Occitania, France	
14	Win	13–1	Mircea Telecan	TKO	3 (6)	17 Mar 2006	Salle Pasquier, Gardanne, France	
13	Win	12–1	Saber Zairi	TKO	2 (8)	10 Feb 2006	Les Pennes-Mirabeau, Provence-Alpes-Côte d'Azur, France	
12	Win	11–1	Imrich Bôrka	KO	2 (6)	25 Nov 2005	Besse, Besse-et-Saint-Anastaise, France	
11	Win	10–1	Enis Boussandel	TKO	4 (8)	4 Nov 2005	Salle Jean Roure, Les Pennes-Mirabeau, France	1/4 Finale Cruiserweight French Championship
10	Win	9–1	Alessio Sakara	KO	5 (10)	8 Jul 2005	Centralino Stadio del tennis Foro Italico, Rome, Italy	Won vacant IBF Youth cruiserweight title
9	Win	8–1	Radouane Ferchichi	TKO	4 (8)	17 Jun 2005	Gymnase J. Roure, Les Pennes-Mirabeau, France	
8	Win	7–1	Saber Zairi	PTS	8	25 Mar 2005	Salle Jean Roure, Les Pennes-Mirabeau, France	
7	Win	6–1	Radouane Ferchichi	PTS	8	12 Mar 2005	Clermont-Ferrand, Auergne-Rhône-Alpes, Frabce	
6	Win	5–1	Mounir Chibi	PTS	6	22 Jan 2005	Clermont-Ferrand, Auvergne-Rhône-Alpes, France	
5	Win	4–1	Ola King Adams	TKO	2 (6)	19 Nov 2004	Palais des Sports, Marseille, France	
4	Win	3–1	Redwane Boukhenazer	TKO	3 (6)	18 Jun 2004	Les Pennes-Mirabeau, Provence-Alpes-Côte d'Azur, France	Finale du tournoi de France Lourd-Léger
3	Win	2–1	Julien Brival	TKO	3 (6)	10 Apr 2004	Uzès, Occitania, France	1/2 finale du tournoi de France Lourd-Léger
2	Win	1–1	Malik Yahiaoui	PTS	4	21 Feb 2004	Lorient, Brittany, France	
1	Loss	0–1	Omar Bellouati	TKO	4 (4)	10 Oct 2003	Palais des Sports, Marseille, France	
