= Giulian Ilie =

Romanian boxer

Personal information
- Nickname: The Dentist
- Nationality: (Romania) Romanian
- Born: Iulian George Ilie; July 16, 1977 (age 49) Ploiești, Romania
- Height: 5 ft 11 1/2 in (182 cm)
- Weight: Cruiserweight

Boxing career
- Stance: Orthodox

Boxing record
- Total fights: 38
- Wins: 21
- Win by KO: 7
- Losses: 15
- Draws: 2
- No contests: 0

Giulian Ilie (born July 16, 1977) is a Romanian professional boxer living and fighting out of Rimini, Italy.

== Professional career ==
Ilie became the new IBF International cruiserweight champion, after scoring a split decision win over the rough stablemate, Cristian Dolzanelli (16–2–1, 10 KOs) on November 26, 2011, at the Local Sport Hall in Rezzato, Italy. It was a stunning upset, unheralded warrior Ilie outscored favorite Dolzanelli over twelve rounds, with a football-like atmosphere with competing fans screaming loudly to support their hero, the brave Dolzanelli was knocked down in the seventh round and was able to survive only thanks to his great lion heart. The local warrior tried to re-enter in the fight but Ilie was simply too strong and consistent during the others rounds and despite a strong final round from Dolzanelli, Ilie hung on to take the fight 114–113, 116–111, 113–114 on the judges’ scorecards. For the Romanian it was the first title of his pro career.

On 16 September 2011, Ilie, as underdog, stopped previously unbeaten Salvatore Erittu of Italy in round two and clinched the vacant IBF Inter-Continental title at 200 lbs. Ilie was coming from another win on Italian soil, having defeated Cristian Dolzanelli in December last year. Erittu (now 21–1) was supposed to restore the Italian pride but clearly Ilie had other plans as he started at full speed and tried to bring the fight to the much taller Erittu. After an even first round, Ilie was able to find his distance and connected with a clean right hook to Erittu's chin: the Italian contender was up but still wobbled and, after another barrage by Ilie, referee Vincent Dupas of France stopped the fight for good.

== Professional record ==
21 Wins (6 knockouts, 15 decisions), 15 Losses, 2 Draws
Res.	Record	Opponent	Type	Rd., Time	Date	Location	Notes
Loss	21-15-2	(Latvia) Nikolajs Grisunins	TKO	1 (8)	2017-07-29	SemaraH Hotel Lielupe, Jurmala, Latvia	
Loss	21-14-2	(Germany) Nikola Milacic	UD	4 (4)	2017-03-18	Baltiska Hallen, Malmo, Sweden	
Loss	21-13-2	(Serbia) Nenad Pagonis	UD	8 (8)	2017-03-04	Boxcamp P1, Berlin, Germany	
Loss	21-12-2	(France) Arsen Goulamirian	TKO	2 (8)	2016-10-22	Casino de Deauville, Deauville, France	
Loss	21-11-2	(Poland) Michal Cieslak	TKO	2 (8)	2016-09-17	(Poland) Ergo Arena, Gdansk	
Win	21-10-2	(Romania) Adrian Parlogea	TKO	2 (6)	2016-06-29	(Hungary) Gentlemen Fight Club Boxing House, Budapest	
Loss	20-10-2	(Canada) Denton Daley	KO	2 (12)	2015-08-29	(Canada) Ontario	
Loss	20-9-2	(Hungary) Imre Szello	UD	8 (8)	2015-04-17	(Hungary) Budakalász	
Loss	20-8-2	(Russia) Dmitry Kudryashov	RTD	2 (10)	2014-10-18	(Russia) Rostov-na-Donu	
Loss	20-7-2	(Russia) Rakhim Chakhkiyev	KO	10 (10)	2013-10-05	(Russia) Moscow	
Win	20-6-2	(Hungary) Gábor Nagy	KO	2 (6)	2013-08-23	(Romania) Galați	
Win	19-6-2	(Hungary) Péter Erdős	UD	8 (8)	2013-02-22	(Romania) Galați	
Loss	18-6-2	(Switzerland) Nuri Seferi	MD	8 (8)	2012-07-07	(Switzerland) Bern	
Loss	18-5-2	(Poland) Paweł Kołodziej	UD	12 (12)	2012-03-17	(Poland) Krynica-Zdrój	Lost IBF Inter-Continental Cruiserweight Title.
Win	18-4-2	(Italy) Salvatore Erittu	TKO	2 (12)	2011-09-16	(Italy) Arzachena	Won vacant IBF Inter-Continental Cruiserweight Title.
Win	17-4-2	(Italy) Cristian Dolzanelli	SD	12 (12)	2010-11-26	(Italy) Rezzato	Won vacant IBF International Cruiserweight Title.
Win	16-4-2	(Romania) Marian Geroseanu	KO	1 (6)	2010-09-18	(Romania) Ploiești	
Loss	15-4-2	(Poland) Dawid Kostecki	UD	12 (12)	2010-04-24	(Poland) Gdynia	For vacant WBF Light Heavyweight Title.
Win	15-3-2	(Czech Republic) Jindrich Velecky	UD	6 (6)	2010-04-16	(France) Hénin-Beaumont	
Loss	14-3-2	(Albania) Vigan Mustafa	DQ	6 (8)	2010-02-20	(Italy) Scandicci	
Draw	14-2-2	(Italy) Stefano Abatangelo	PTS	6 (6)	2009-05-22	(Italy) Rezzato	
Win	14-2-1	(Latvia) Jevgenijs Andrejevs	UD	4 (4)	2008-03-27	(Sweden) Gothenburg	
Win	13-2-1	(Germany) Lars Buchholz	UD	4 (4)	2007-12-18	(Sweden) Gothenburg	
Win	12-2-1	(Denmark) Kim Jenssen	UD	4 (4)	2007-09-15	(Sweden) Karlstad	
Win	11-2-1	(Germany) Werner Kreiskott	UD	4 (4)	2007-03-31	(Sweden) Gothenburg	
Draw	10-2-1	(Croatia) Josip Jalusic	PTS	4 (4)	2007-01-27	(Sweden) Gothenburg	
Loss	10-2	(Hungary) Tamas Popovics	PTS	6 (6)	2005-12-10	(Hungary) Győr	
Loss	10-1	(Czech Republic) Ladislav Kutil	SD	12 (12)	2005-11-06	(Czech Republic) Prague	For vacant IBF Eastern Europe and Central Asia Light Heavyweight Title.
Win	10-0	(Hungary) Arpad Buzasi	TKO	2 (6)	2005-08-07	(Italy) Rimini	
Win	9-0	(Albania) Selajdin Koxha	TD	6 (8)	2005-07-03	(Italy) Pezzaze	
Win	8-0	(Romania) Octavian Stoica	PTS	6 (6)	2005-03-19	(Italy) Rimini	
Win	7-0	(Romania) Gringo Mandache	PTS	6 (6)	2005-02-18	(Italy) Rovigo	
Win	6-0	(Montenegro) Milojko Pivljanin	DQ	4 (6)	2004-12-10	(Italy) Piacenza	
Win	5-0	(Hungary) Zoltan Kallai	PTS	6 (6)	2004-11-12	(Italy) Collegno	
Win	4-0	(Italy) Marco Fioravanti	TKO	5 (6)	2004-10-29	(Italy) Ariano nel Polesine	
Win	3-0	(Italy) Peter Homola	TKO	2 (6)	2004-07-17	(Italy) Paratico	
