= W.A.K.O. European Championships 1998 (Leverkusen) =

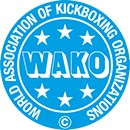
- The poster for W.A.K.O. European Championships 1998
- Promotion: W.A.K.O.
- Date: 1 December (Start); 6 December 1998 (End)
- City: Leverkusen, Germany

Event chronology
W.A.K.O. World Championships 1997	W.A.K.O. European Championships 1998	W.A.K.O. World Championships 1999 (Bishkek)

W.A.K.O. European Championships 1998 in Leverkusen were the joint fourteenth European kickboxing championships (the other was held in Kyiv the same year) hosted by the W.A.K.O. organization and the fourth championships (world and European) to be held in Germany. The event was open to amateur men and women based in Europe only and there were just the two styles on offer; Full-Contact and Light-Contact kickboxing. By the end of the championships Russia was by far the dominant nation in terms of medals won, with Poland second and Hungary third. The event was held in Leverkusen, Germany over six days starting on Tuesday, 1 December and ending on Sunday, 6 December 1998.

== Full-Contact ==
Full-Contact is a form of kickboxing where fights are won primarily by stoppage or points decision, with kicks and punches allowed above the waist, although unlike professional kickboxing fighters had to wear head and body protection - more detail on the rules are available on the W.A.K.O. website. At Leverkusen the men had twelve weight classes ranging from 51 kg/112.2 lbs to over 91 kg/+200.2 lbs, while the women had six, ranging from 48 kg/105.6 lbs to over 65 kg/+143 lbs. Notable medalists included Robert Nowak, Almaz Gismeev and future female boxing legend Natascha Ragosina who had all won gold medals back at the last European championships in Belgrade. By the championships end Russia was the strongest nation overall in Full-Contact, winning five golds, three silvers and three bronzes.

=== Men's Full-Contact Kickboxing Medals Table ===
Event	Gold	Silver	Bronze
Light Bantamweight -51 kg	Merguen Mongush (Russia)	Gabor Aburko (Ukraine)	Damian Ławniczak (Poland); Kuvat Kurbanov (Turkmenistan)
Bantamweight -54 kg	Francesco De Luca (Italy)	Milisav Ilic (Serbia and Montenegro)	Kenneth Johansen (Norway); Alexandre Fedozov (Russia)
Featherweight -57 kg	Thomas Karlsson (Sweden)	Fouad Habbani (France)	Armen Ohanyan (Armenia); Laszco Velsei (Hungary)
Lightweight -60 kg	Muzaffer Tosun (Turkey)	Artur Sergeev (Russia)	Daniel Korner (Germany); Zoubahir Mamoudi (France)
Light Welterweight -63.5 kg	Dosaev Gani (Kazakhstan)	Gyoergy Bugyik (Hungary)	Giuseppe Lorusso (Italy); Marco Seifert (Germany)
Welterweight -67 kg	Giga Kordzadze (Georgia (country))	Sven Kirsten (Germany)	Terje Arildsen (Norway); Roman Bashkaton (Azerbaijan)
Light Middleweight -71 kg	Robert Nowak (Poland)	Khalmurad Izmailov (Turkmenistan)	Mikhail Plotnikov (Kazakhstan); Lasylo Barany (Hungary)
Middleweight -75 kg	Zoran Stanković (Serbia and Montenegro)	Andreas Tuft (Norway)	Gerard Zdziarski (Poland); Roman Chmil (Ukraine)
Light Heavyweight -81 kg	Aleksei Solovjov (Russia)	Viktor Savchenko (Ukraine)	Mittally Tiszai (Hungary); Roman Dakolinsh (Latvia)
Cruiserweight -86 kg	Igor Pylypenko (Ukraine)	Petri Reima (Finland)	Dmitri Sobennicov (Russia); Attila Sarkoezi (Hungary)
Heavyweight -91 kg	Elvir Behlulovic (Bosnia and Herzegovina)	Gergely Csölle (Slovakia)	Ramazi Kikalishvili (Georgia (country)); Lubos Koptak (Czech Republic)
Super Heavyweight +91 kg	Almaz Gismeev (Russia)	Patrik Matejka (Slovakia)	Vlatko Sorola (Croatia); Vladyslav Chornyi (Ukraine)

=== Women's Full-Contact Kickboxing Medals Table ===
Event	Gold	Silver	Bronze
Bantamweight -48 kg	Veronique Legras (France)	Alina Shaternikova (Ukraine)	Erzsebet Borosi (Hungary); Giovanna Neglia (Italy)
Featherweight -52 kg	Christine de Ruggiero (France)	Helena Karpatchyova (Russia)	Oksana Ivasiva (Ukraine); Edyta Olewniczak (Poland)
Lightweight -56 kg	Tatyana Chalaj (Russia)	Viktoria Rudenko (Ukraine)	Iwona Guzowska (Poland); Heidi Hutari (Finland)
Middleweight -60 kg	Julia Voskoboinik (Lebanon)	Anna Kasprzak (Poland)	Elza Midzic (Bosnia and Herzegovina); Tatyana Alalutdinova (Russia)
Light Heavyweight -65 kg	Agnieszka Rylik (Poland)	Zulfiya Kutdyusova (Russia)	Suzana Stunja (Croatia); Tanja Vujic (Serbia and Montenegro)
Heavyweight +65 kg	Natascha Ragosina (Russia)	Ivana Derdic (Croatia)	Bojava Trajkovic (Serbia and Montenegro); Marianne Antersberger (Germany)

== Light-Contact ==
Light-Contact is a form of kickboxing that is less physical than Full-Contact but more so than Semi-Contact and is often seen as an intermediate step between the two. Fights are generally won by points scored on the basis of speed and technique over brute force and both fighters must wear head and body protection - more detail on Light-Contact rules can be found on the official W.A.K.O. website. The men had eight weight divisions ranging from 57 kg/125.4 lbs to over 89 kg/+195.8 lbs while the women had five ranging from 50 kg/110 lbs to over 65 kg/143 lbs. The most notable winner was Tomaž Barada who added to the gold he won at the last European championships. By the end of the event Hungary was the top nation overall in Light-Contact with two golds, six silvers and two bronze medals.

=== Men's Light-Contact Kickboxing Medals Table ===
Event	Gold	Silver	Bronze
-57 kg	Rafal Kaluzny (Poland)	Dezső Debreczeni (Hungary)	Diego Bianco (Italy); Denis Van Ngoc (Germany)
-63 kg	Tomaž Barada (Slovenia)	Antonio Coletta (Italy)	Dawid Kowalski (Poland); Che Deane (United Kingdom)
-69 kg	Alexander Starostin (Russia)	Oliver Stricz (Hungary)	Aleksandr Sukhoviy (Ukraine); Andreas Hahn (Germany)
-74 kg	Boris Zalyotkin (Russia)	Tamas Hudoba (Hungary)	Sergey Zaharchuk (Ukraine); Darren Duncan (Republic of Ireland)
-79 kg	Zoltan Dancso (Hungary)	Alexei Zalyotkin (Russia)	Roland Conar (Germany); Miroslav Sobotka (Czech Republic)
-84 kg	Martin Albers (Germany)	Laszlo Toth (Hungary)	Bartolomeo Bonvino (Italy); Muhammad Ali Durmaz (Turkey)
-89 kg	Klaus Wilkinson (United Kingdom)	Zsolt Molnar (Hungary)	Radek Nekvinda (Czech Republic); Michal Wszolek (Poland)
+89 kg	Michael Kruckenhauser (Austria)	István Tóth (Hungary)	Gianmario Franchina (Italy); Jacek Puchacz (Poland)

=== Women's Light-Contact Kickboxing Medals Table ===
Event	Gold	Silver	Bronze
-50 kg	Szilvia Csicsely (Hungary)	Sonia De Biase (Italy)	Marie Laure Miviere (France); Julita Tkaczyk (Poland)
-55 kg	Bianca Tapilatu (Slovenia)	Rita Pesuth (Hungary)	Stephanie Rzehak (Poland); Adriana Popa (Romania)
-60 kg	Emanuela Amisani (Italy)	Lisa Palme (Sweden)	Judit Gal (Hungary); Monika Florek (Poland)
-65 kg	Marianne Klemmstein (Germany)	Lidiya Sharapova (Russia)	Petra Hochstrasser (Switzerland); Csilla Bodoe (Hungary)
+65 kg	Sallie McArdle (Republic of Ireland)	Anja Renfordt (Germany)	Katarzyna Balcerzar (Poland); Annalisa Ghilardi (Italy)

== Overall Medals Standing (Top 5) ==
Ranking	Country	Gold (gold)	Silver (silver)	Bronze (bronze)
1	Russia	7	5	3
2	Poland	3	1	11
3	Hungary	2	7	6
4	Germany	2	2	6
4	Italy	2	2	6
5	France	2	1	1

== See also ==
- List of WAKO Amateur European Championships
- List of WAKO Amateur World Championships
