= Achieng =

Achieng is both a given name and a surname. Notable people with the name include:

- Conjestina Achieng (born 1977), Kenyan boxer
- Sarah Opendi Achieng (born 1968), Ugandan politician
- Achieng Abura (died 2016), Kenyan musician
- Achieng Ajulu-Bushell (born 1994), British swimmer
- Achieng Oneko (1920–2007), Kenyan freedom fighter and politician
