= Zabeg =

- Date: May 20 onwards
- Location: Moscow, St. Petersburg, Nizhny Novgorod, Samara, Kazan, Rostov-on-Don, Yekaterinburg, Novosibirsk, Krasnoyarsk, Vladivostok
- Event type: Road
- Distance: 21 km, 10 km, 5 km, 2 km
- Established: 2017
- Website: забег.рф

Zabeg (Russian: ЗаБег) is Russia’s first half marathon with a synchronized start. The event’s participants reside in various cities across the country. The half marathon is hosted by the League of Heroes.

== History ==
The first half-marathon "Zabeg" was held on May 21, 2017. It spanned 10 Russian cities: Moscow, St. Petersburg, Nizhny Novgorod, Samara, Kazan, Rostov-on-Don, Yekaterinburg, Novosibirsk, Krasnoyarsk, and Vladivostok. The event had 40,000 participants, with 6,000 being from St. Petersburg. The winning title of the Marathon Capital of Russia went to the city of Kazan. To celebrate the occasion, Tatarstan’s president Rustam Minnikhanov received the Marathon Capital Cup. The half marathon was supported by a number of Russian celebrities, including Ivan Urgant, Tina Kandelaki, Basta, Natascha Ragosina, Kostya Tszyu, Vladimir Solovyov, Natalya Antyukh, Igor Gulyaev, and Vasily Smolny.

The 2018 half marathon will cover 15 Russian cities, including Moscow, St. Petersburg, Nizhny Novgorod, Samara, Kazan, Rostov-on-Don, Yekaterinburg, Ufa, Krasnodar, Omsk, Yaroslavl, Sevastopol, Novosibirsk, Krasnoyarsk, and Vladivostok.

== Participation formats ==
The half marathon features 4 participation formats:

- Junior: a 2 km race for minors.
- Novice: a 5 km race for people new to running.
- Amateur: a 10 km race.
- Pro: a professional 21 km half marathon race.

The event’s programme also includes concerts, a healthy eating expo, extreme and fire shows, photo sessions in a special zone, a food court, and a light and music show. The participants and guests are welcomed to contribute to a diverse range of contests and quizzes, and to attend workshops hosted by CrossFit and extreme sports experts.

== Russia’s Marathon Capital ==
The title of Russia’s Marathon Capital is awarded depending on the half marathon results. The judges’ choice depends on the following:

- the average distance successfully covered by all runners from the given city,
- the share of "Zabeg" runners in the city's population,
- the runners’ average speed.

After the first half-marathon "Zabeg", the title went to Kazan. Kseniya Shoygu, head of the League of Heroes, pointed out, “All our calculations were objective and unbiased, and when it comes to the number of runners, Kazan was far ahead of the other cities”.

== Gallery ==
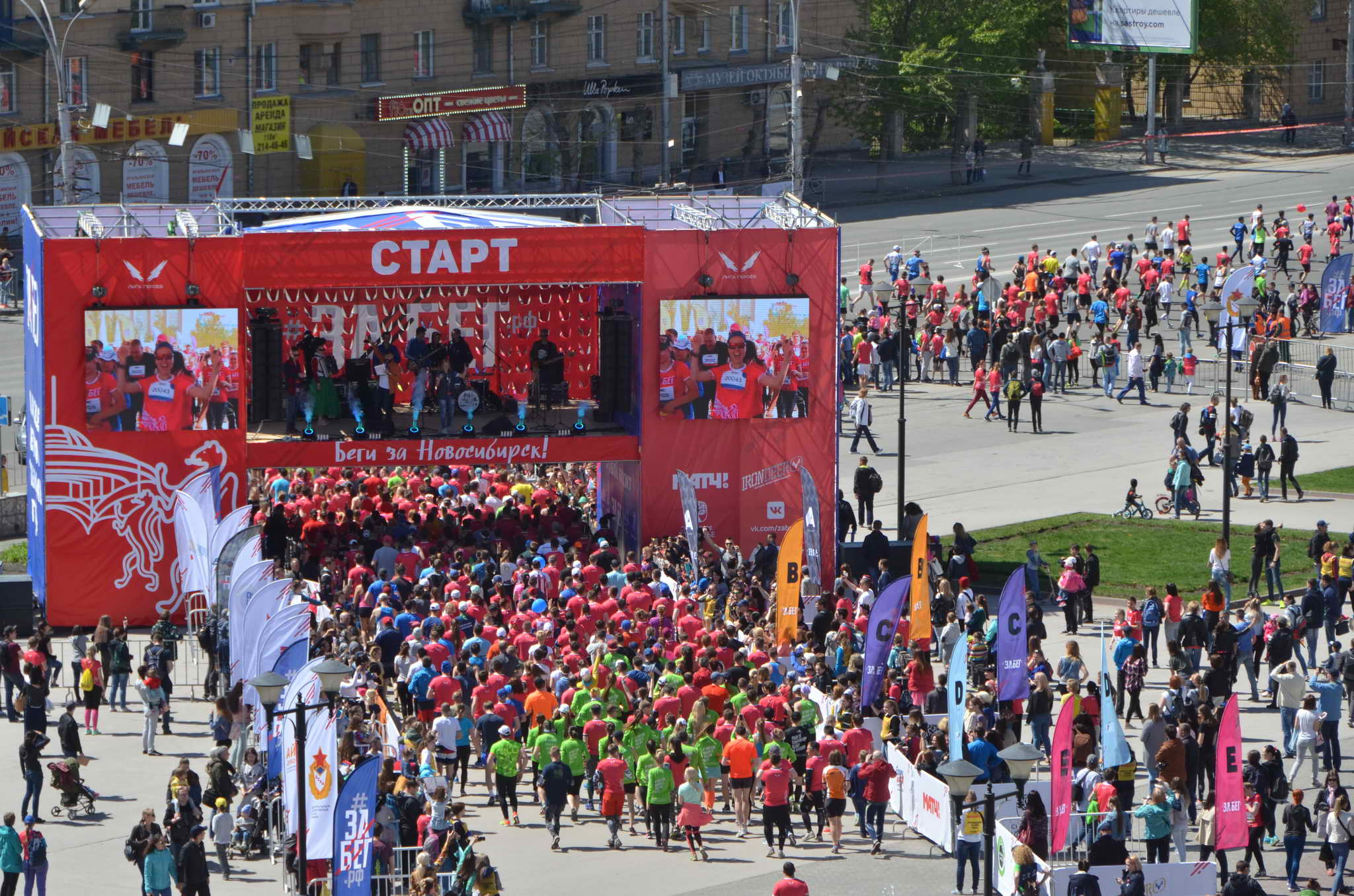

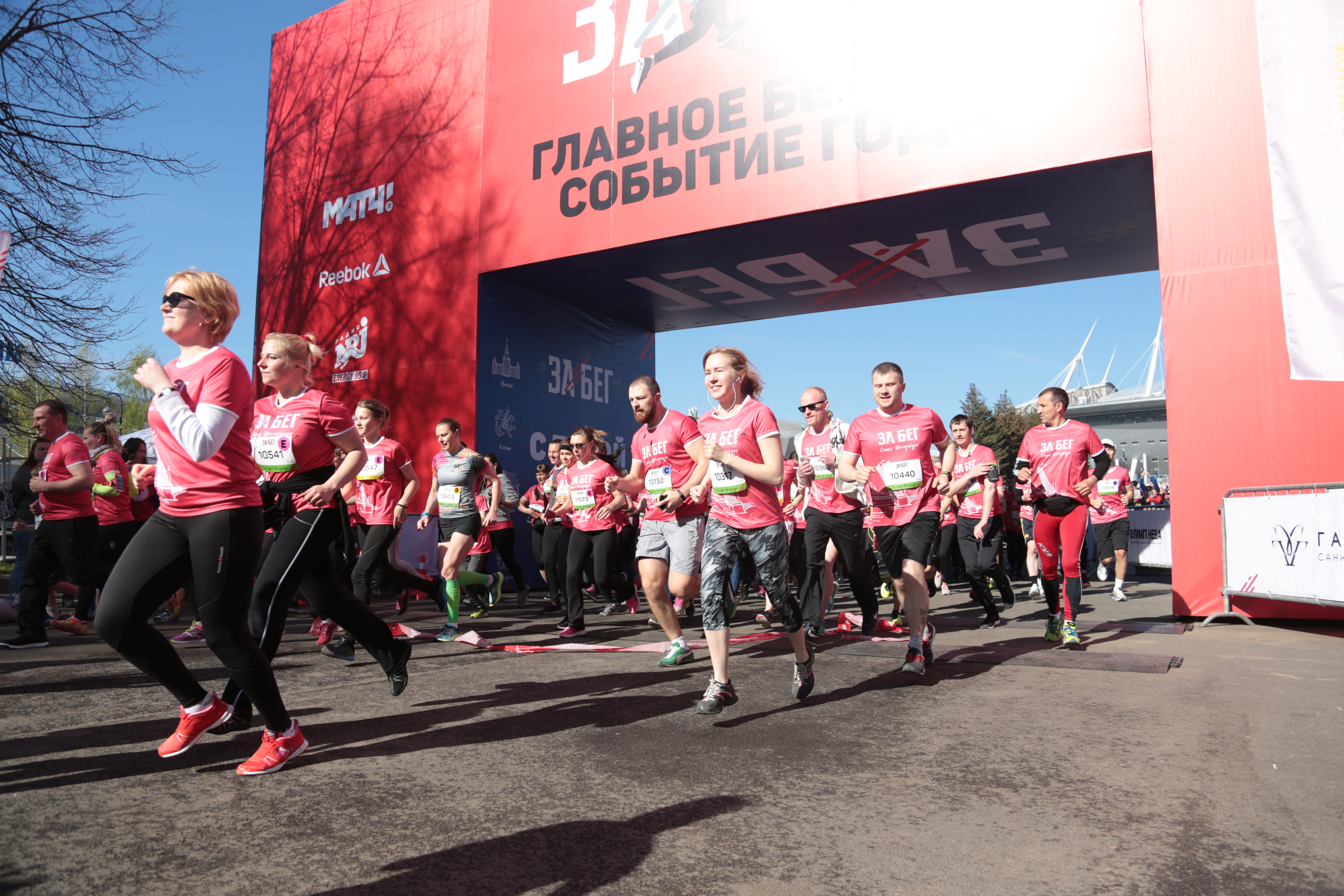

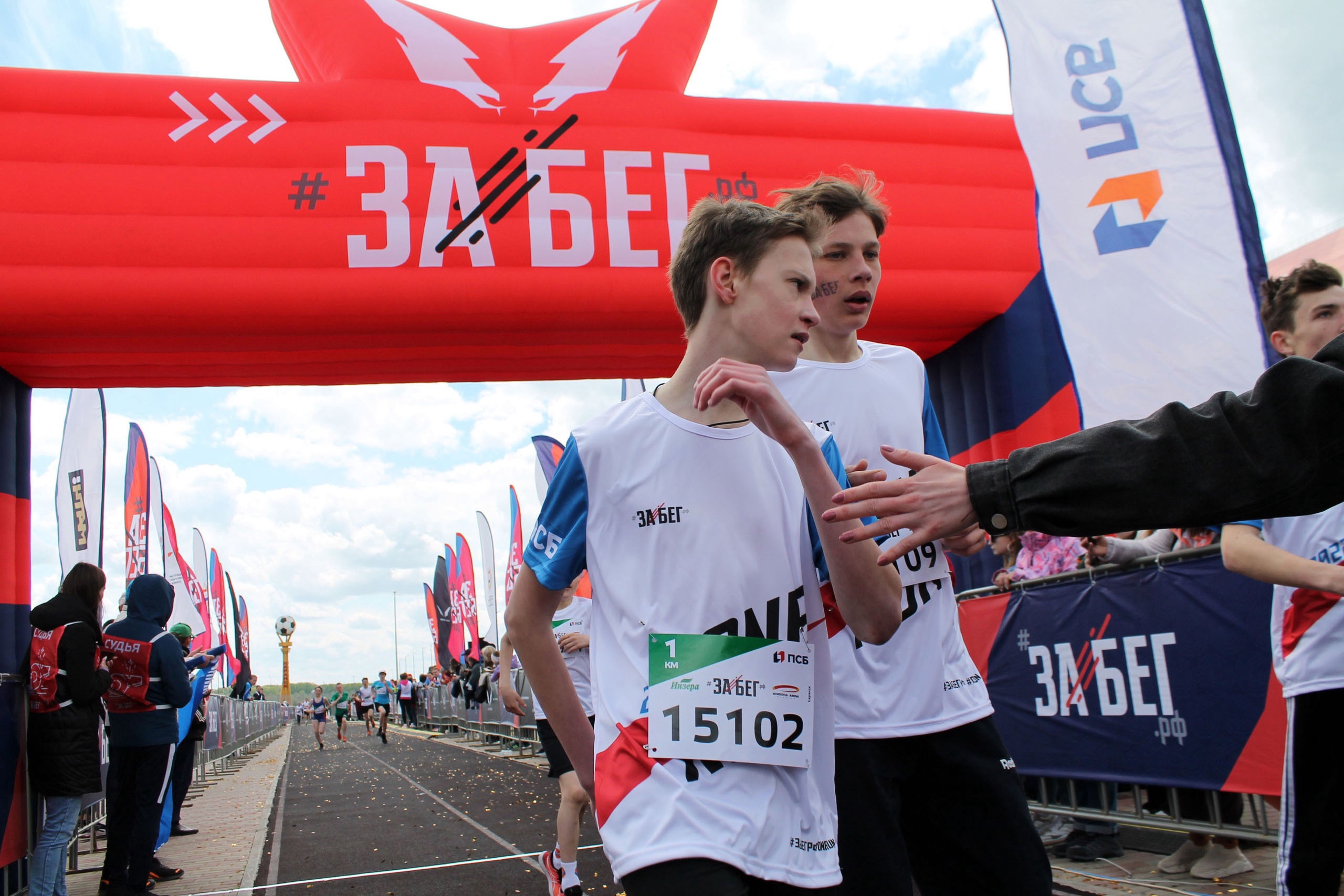

== Trivia ==
- The medals are exclusive for runners from each participating city, featuring a design that symbolizes the city's mascot or main landmark.
- A clean bill of health is required for taking part in the event.
