= W.A.K.O. European Championships 1996 =

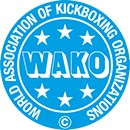
- The poster for W.A.K.O. European Championships 1996
- Promotion: W.A.K.O.
- Date: October 1996
- City: Belgrade, Serbia and Montenegro

Event chronology
W.A.K.O. World Championships 1995	W.A.K.O. European Championships 1996	W.A.K.O. World Championships 1997

W.A.K.O. European Championships 1996 were the thirteenth European kickboxing championships hosted by the W.A.K.O. organization arranged by the Serbia and Montenegro kickboxing president Borislav Pelević. The event was the first ever to be held in Serbia and Montenegro and welcomed the country back into the international community after the devastation of the Bosnian War. It was open to amateur men and women representing thirty-seven countries in Europe - more detail on the participating nations is provided in the relevant section below.

There were four styles on offer in Belgrade; Full-Contact, Low-Kick (men only), Semi-Contact and Light-Contact, with no room for Musical Forms. By the end of the championships, Poland just about shaded Italy into first place by virtue of more silver medals, while Hungary came in third. The event was held in Belgrade, Serbia and Montenegro in October, 1996.

== Participating nations ==
There were thirty-seven nations from across Europe in attendance at the 1996 W.A.K.O. European Championships in Belgrade:

- Armenia
- Azerbaijan
- Bulgaria
- (Belgium) Belarus
- Cyprus
- Czech Republic
- Denmark
- Estonia
- France
- (United Kingdom) Great Britain
- (Georgia (country)) Georgia
- Germany
- Greece
- Hungary
- Republic of Ireland
- Italy
- Kazakhstan
- Kyrgyzstan
- Latvia
- Lithuania
- (North Macedonia) Macedonia
- Moldova
- Norway
- Palestine
- Poland
- Portugal
- Republika Srpska
- Russia
- Serbia and Montenegro
- Slovakia
- Slovenia
- Switzerland
- Syria
- Tajikistan
- Turkey
- Turkmenistan

== Full-Contact ==
Full-Contact was available for both men and women at Belgrade and involved the participants trying to win the contest either by a point decision or via stoppage using both kicks and punches – more detail on the rules can be found at the W.A.K.O. website, although be aware that they may have changed slightly since 1993. The men had twelve weight classes ranging from 51 kg/112.2 lbs to over 91 kg/+200.2 lbs, while the women had six weight divisions ranging from 48 kg/105.6 lbs to over 65 kg/+143 lbs. Notable gold medalists included Gary "Smiler" Turner who would go on to win several regional tournaments in K-1, Roman Bugaj who would later turn to pro boxing (and also won silver at the same event in Light-Contact) and Natascha Ragosina who would become a legend in women's boxing. Another notable medalists was Barrington Patterson who would have some success on the European MMA circuit, as well as becoming a pro-kickboxing world champion. By the end of the championships, Poland were the strongest nation in Full-Contact, winning five golds and four bronzes across both the male and female competitions.

=== Men's Full-Contact Kickboxing Medals Table ===
Event	Gold	Silver	Bronze
Light Bantamweight -51 kg	Nurzhan Erbusinov (Kazakhstan)	Alexey Kutsenko (Ukraine)	Gabor Aburko (Hungary); Andrei Ivanov (Russia)
Bantamweight -54 kg	Mariusz Cieśliński (Poland)	Askar Mozhanov (Kazakhstan)	Innokenti Makarov (Russia); Bilal Mahmoud Sliman (Palestine)
Featherweight -57 kg	Fouad Habbani (France)	Hidir Erdogan (Germany)	Goran Vuckovic (Serbia and Montenegro); Maurycy Gojko (Poland)
Lightweight -60 kg	Agadilov Bakhytzhan (Kazakhstan)	James Dard (France)	Ahmet Pepic (Serbia and Montenegro); Alexander Lebed (Ukraine)
Light Welterweight -63.5 kg	Dosaev Gani (Kazakhstan)	Youssef Latahoui (France)	Giuseppe Lorusso (Italy); Erlan Shiderbaev (Turkmenistan)
Welterweight -67 kg	Arsen Khachatryan (Armenia)	Srdjan Elezovic (Serbia and Montenegro)	Miroslaw Karzinski (Poland); Árpád Szabó (Hungary)
Light Middleweight -71 kg	Robert Nowak (Poland)	Gerd Dittrich (Germany)	Thomas Kristiansen (Norway); Hatzionidis Tasos (Greece)
Middleweight -75 kg	Halim El Hakimi (France)	Vladimir Tomkovich (Latvia)	Dusan Plecas (Republika Srpska); Ramin Abtin (Germany)
Light Heavyweight -81 kg	Igor Pilipenko (Ukraine)	Ion Slivestru (Moldova)	Christophe Lartizien (France); Robert Zlotkowski (Poland)
Cruiserweight -86 kg	Roman Bugaj (Poland)	Bozidar Dermanovic (Serbia and Montenegro)	Kostas Athanasopoulos (Greece); Timur Ioussupov (Russia)
Heavyweight -91 kg	Gary Turner (United Kingdom)	Frode Holst (Norway)	John Latsonas (Greece); Darko Milasinovic (Serbia and Montenegro)
Super Heavyweight +91 kg	Almaz Gismeev (Russia)	Roman Kracik (Czech Republic)	Barrington Patterson (United Kingdom); Askar Kokhanov (Bulgaria)

=== Women's Full-Contact Kickboxing Medals Table ===
Event	Gold	Silver	Bronze
Bantamweight -48 kg	Marie Laure Niviere (Italy)	Sladjana Nikolic (Serbia and Montenegro)	Reka Krempf (Hungary); Francesca Lupo (Italy)
Featherweight -52 kg	Elisabette Legras (France)	Oksana Ivasiva (Ukraine)	Hülya Şahin (Germany); Michela Barnini (Italy)
Lightweight -56 kg	Iwona Guzowska (Poland)	Bea Gulyas (Hungary)	Silvia Bratina (Italy); Galyna Guenliyska (Bulgaria)
Middleweight -60 kg	Anna Kasprzqak (Poland)	Henriette Birkeland (Norway)	Zoulfia Koutdicussova (Russia); Christien Derugeiro (France)
Light Heavyweight -65 kg	Sanja Savcic (Serbia and Montenegro)	Olga Slavinskaja (Russia)	Agnieszka Rylik (Poland); Margarita Platonova (Lithuania)
Heavyweight +65 kg	Natascha Ragosina (Russia)	Cristina Cerpi (Italy)	Larisa Berezenko (Ukraine); Dragana Ignijatic (Serbia and Montenegro)

== Low-Kick ==
Low-Kick differs from Full-Contact kickboxing in that it allows kicks below the knee - more detail on Low-Kick rules can be found at the W.A.K.O. website, although be aware that there may have been some rule changes since 1996. The style was available to men only and there was twelve weight classes ranging from 51 kg/112.2 lbs to over 91 kg/+200.2 lbs. Notable winners in this category included Ivan Strugar who would go on to win multiple European and world kickboxing titles and Cengiz Koç who would also have some success as an amateur boxer. By the championships end the host nation Serbia and Montenegro were the strongest country in Low-Kick, winning two golds, one silver and four bronze medals.

=== Men's Low-Kick Kickboxing Medals Table ===
Event	Gold	Silver	Bronze
Light Bantamweight -51 kg	Elmurat Kalypzhanov (Kazakhstan)	Shanan Shadmanov (Kyrgyzstan)	Alberto Costa (Portugal); Otkur Hoodoyarov (Tajikistan)
Bantamweight -54 kg	Vassili Vassilev (Russia)	Mahmud Abdrahmanov (Tajikistan)	Saken Aubakirov (Kazakhstan); Dimitar Peschev (Bulgaria)
Featherweight -57 kg	Sebastien Sanchez (France)	Marat Safin (Russia)	Zoltan Nagymihaly (Hungary); Aibek Namazbekov (Tajikistan)
Lightweight -60 kg	Alessio Pastifieri (Italy)	Vassili Pavlov (Russia)	Vesel Bitic (Serbia and Montenegro); Omar Akl (Lebanon)
Light Welterweight -63.5 kg	Djanbulat Amantaev (Kyrgyzstan)	Sergej Egorov (Poland)	Evgeni Denisov (Estonia); Nikolai Korenev (Ukraine)
Welterweight -67 kg	Milos Plecas (Republika Srpska)	Jan Kacanovskij (Lithuania)	Radonjic Stanislav (Serbia and Montenegro); Csaba Molnár (Hungary)
Light Middleweight -71 kg	Ivan Strugar (Serbia and Montenegro)	Bahyt Drozbaev (Kyrgyzstan)	Eddy Frair (France); Aleksei Polishuk (Ukraine)
Middleweight -75 kg	Daniele Petroni (Italy)	Csaba Gabnai (Hungary)	Marius Bructer (France); Milovan Gasic (Serbia and Montenegro)
Light Heavyweight -81 kg	Radojica Vakirevic (Serbia and Montenegro)	Konstantin Shvets (Ukraine)	Serej Kanunnikov (Estonia); Milan Hrsum (Republika Srpska)
Cruiserweight -86 kg	Igor Skevel (Ukraine)	Zoran Pekovski (North Macedonia)	Thierry Louison (France); Dimitrj Krotov (Russia)
Heavyweight -91 kg	Ion Georgiu (Moldova)	Resul Doğan (Turkey)	Vesko Cejovic (Serbia and Montenegro); Fanil Durdanov (Russia)
Super Heavyweight +91 kg	Cengiz Koç (Turkey)	Mirko Vlahović (Serbia and Montenegro)	Arman Ahashev (Kazakhstan); Mouloud Houdbert (France)

== Semi-Contact ==
Semi-Contact is a form of kickboxing in which fights were won by points given due to technique, skill and speed, with physical force limited - more information on Semi-Contact can be found on the W.A.K.O. website, although the rules will have changed since 1996. Men and women both took part with the men having eight weight divisions ranging from 57 kg/125.4 lbs to over 89 kg/+195.8 lbs and the women having five ranging from 50 kg/110 lbs to over 65 kg/143 lbs. By the end of the championships Italy was the most successful nation overall in Semi-Contact, winning four golds, one silver and four bronze medals.

=== Men's Semi-Contact Kickboxing Medals Table ===
Event	Gold	Silver	Bronze
-57 kg	Dezső Debreczeni (Hungary)	Hasan Aslan (Turkey)	Rafal Kaluzny (Poland); Giampaolo Calajò (Italy)
-63 kg	Martin Kilgus (Germany)	Hasan Cataltas (Turkey)	Andrei Kassianenko (Russia); James Boylan (Republic of Ireland)
-69 kg	Elrik Gundersen (Norway)	Danny Harrison (United Kingdom)	István Tóth (Hungary); Marco Ferrarese (Italy)
-74 kg	Peter Moltner (Italy)	Lajos Hugyetz (Hungary)	Gribl Svenko (Turkey); Miroslav Topic (Croatia)
-79 kg	Peter Edwards (United Kingdom)	Peter Csikos (Hungary)	Christian Patterer (Austria); Roland Conar (Germany)
-84 kg	Emanuele Bozzolani (Italy)	Zoltan Szucs (Hungary)	Clifton Findley (United Kingdom); Josef Ebner (Austria)
-89 kg	Zsolt Molnar (Hungary)	Daough Geogleger (Republic of Ireland)	Giuseppe Fracaroli (Italy); Michael Kruckenhauser (Austria)
+89 kg	Marco Culiersi (Italy)	Josef Patterer (Austria)	Andreas Knab (Germany); Nikolai Morozov (Russia)

=== Women's Semi-Contact Kickboxing Medals Table ===
Event	Gold	Silver	Bronze
-50 kg	Renate Sandland (Norway)	Erna Obralic (Croatia)	Stefani Zimmermann (Germany); Semra Cetintas (Turkey)
-55 kg	Alessandra Catalano (Italy)	Jana Moravoova (Czech Republic)	Rita Pesuth (Hungary); Gonca Bagci (Germany)
-60 kg	Ann-May Viksund (Norway)	Miriam Diller (Germany)	Beata Gulyas (Hungary); Marina Pappalardo (Italy)
-65 kg	Ivana Derdic (Serbia and Montenegro)	Sallie McKirdle (Republic of Ireland)	Anja Binder (Germany); Anita Madsen (Norway)
+65 kg	Line Nilsen (Norway)	Elisabetta Degani (Italy)	Nicola Corbett (Republic of Ireland); Gerlinde Melch (Germany)

== Light-Contact ==
More physical than Semi-Contact but less so than Full-Contact with points awarded and fights won on the basis of speed and technique over power, Light-Contact is seen as a transition stage for fighters who were considering a move from Semi to Full-Contact. More information on Light-Contact rules can be found of the W.A.K.O. website, although be aware that the rules may have changed since 1996. Similar to Semi-Contact the men had eight weight divisions ranging from 57 kg/125.4 lbs to over 89 kg/+195.8 lbs while the women had five ranging from 50 kg/110 lbs to over 65 kg/143 lbs. There were a couple of notable medalists with kickboxing and taekwon-do champion Tomaž Barada winning gold, and future E.B.U. boxing champion Rafał Jackiewicz gaining a bronze. Poland were the strongest country in Light-Contact at the end of the championships, winning three golds, six silvers and two bronzes across the male and female events.

=== Men's Light-Contact Kickboxing Medals Table ===
Event	Gold	Silver	Bronze
-57 kg	Maurycy Goiko (Poland)	Fouad Habanni (France)	Hidir Erdigan (Germany); Martin McMahon (Republic of Ireland)
-63 kg	Tomaž Barada (Slovenia)	Marco Seifert (Germany)	Jaroslaw Madziar (Poland); Rocco Cipriano (Switzerland)
-69 kg	István Tóth (Hungary)	Marco Fuselli (Italy)	Rafał Jackiewicz (Poland); Imed Mathlouti (France)
-74 kg	Lajos Hugyetz (Hungary)	Robert Nowak (Poland)	Paul Lynch (United Kingdom); Ivo Bachor (Germany)
-79 kg	Herman Muehlheim (Switzerland)	Robert Zlotkowski (Poland)	Alessandro Assiro (Italy); Dirk Mell (Germany)
-84 kg	Martin Wilkinson (United Kingdom)	Bartolomeo Bonvino (Italy)	Zoltan Szucs (Hungary); Emmanuel Mendy (France)
-89 kg	Carlos Caneschi (Italy)	Roman Bugaj (Poland)	Anders Gustavsson (Sweden); Carsten Tipelmann (Germany)
+89 kg	Alex Melcher (Germany)	Woijci Szczerbinski (Poland)	Michael Krukenhauser (Austria); David Souchard (France)

=== Women's Light-Contact Kickboxing Medals Table ===
Event	Gold	Silver	Bronze
-50 kg	Daria Chichkina (Russia)	Najda Trebse (Slovenia)	Ildiko Kocs (Hungary); Giovanna Neglia (Italy)
-55 kg	Iwona Guzowska (Poland)	Elisabeth Legras (France)	Rita Pesuth (Hungary); Marzia Davide (Italy)
-60 kg	Beata Gulyas (Hungary)	Anna Kasprzak (Poland)	Deline Horlaville (France); Tina Casey (United Kingdom)
-65 kg	Agnieszka Rylik (Poland)	Sallie McKirdle (Republic of Ireland)	Emanuela Amisani (Italy); Ivana Derdic (Croatia)
+65 kg	Denise Bailey (United Kingdom)	Katarzyn Balcerzak (Poland)	Isabella Orlando (Italy); Silvia Steinke (Germany)

== Overall Medals Standing (Top 5) ==
Ranking	Country	Gold (gold)	Silver (silver)	Bronze (bronze)
1	Poland	8	7	7
2	Italy	8	4	13
3	Hungary	5	5	11
4	France	4	4	10
5	Russia	4	3	8
5	Serbia and Montenegro	4	3	8

== See also ==
- List of WAKO Amateur European Championships
- List of WAKO Amateur World Championships
- List of male kickboxers
- List of female kickboxers
