= Constantin Onofrei =

Romanian boxer

Personal information
- Nationality: Romanian
- Born: 9 May 1976 (age 50) Fălticeni, Romania
- Height: 1.93 m (6 ft 4 in)
- Weight: Heavyweight

Boxing career
- Reach: 1.98 m (78 in)

Boxing record
- Total fights: 23
- Wins: 19
- Win by KO: 14
- Losses: 4
Medal record
Men's amateur boxing
Representing Romania
Romania National Amateur Boxing Championships
Gold medal – first place	1995 Bucharest	+91 kg

Constantin Onofrei (born 9 May 1976) is a Romanian former professional boxer.

== Career ==
As an amateur boxer, Constantin Onofrei won the Romanian National Amateur Boxing Championship at the super heavyweight division in 1995 and represented Romania at the men's super heavyweight event from the 2000 Summer Olympics where he lost in the first round at points against Samuel Peter. He made his professional debut in 2001 at the age of 25 when he defeated Peter Simko by knockout in the first round of a bout held at Kisstadion from Budapest. He won the German International heavyweight title in 2002 after knocking-out Roman Bugaj in the third round. Onofrei defended the German International heavyweight title twice by defeating Adnan Serin and Goran Gogic but lost it against Taras Bidenko in a fight which was also for the WBO Intercontinental heavyweight title. Onofrei's last match took place in 2007 when he lost by knockout against Timo Hoffmann in the fourth round of a bout held in Stadhalle from Rostock.

== Professional boxing record ==
23 fights	19 wins	4 losses
By knockout	14	4
By decision	5	0

No.	Result	Record	Opponent	Type	Round, time	Date	Location	Notes
23	Loss	19–4	(Germany) Timo Hoffmann	KO	4 (8), 1:12	3 March 2007	Stadthalle, Rostock, Germany	
22	Loss	19–3	(Belarus) Valery Chechenev	KO	5 (8), 1:41	28 May 2005	Hanns-Martin-Schleyer-Halle, Stuttgart, Germany	
21	Loss	19–2	(Ukraine) Taras Bidenko	TKO	7 (12)	14 December 2004	Freizeit Arena, Soelden, Austria	For German International heavyweight title and vacant WBO Intercontinental heavyweight title; Onofrei's corner threw in the towel.
20	Win	19–1	(Czech Republic) Vladislav Druso	PTS	8 (8)	26 October 2004	Scandlines Arena, Rostock, Germany	
19	Win	18–1	(Montenegro) Goran Gogic	TKO	9 (10), 1:08	31 July 2004	Hanns-Martin-Schleyer-Halle, Stuttgart, Germany	Retained German International heavyweight title.
18	Win	17–1	(Germany) Adnan Serin	MD	10 (10)	30 March 2004	Saaltheater Geulen, Aachen, Germany	Retained German International heavyweight title.
17	Loss	16–1	(France) Thierry Guezouli	KO	3	29 November 2003	Lausitz Arena, Cottbus, Germany	
16	Win	16–0	(Poland) Krzysztof Ogonek	TKO	1 (6)	23 September 2003	Universum Gym, Wandsbek, Germany	
15	Win	15–0	(Hungary) Zoltan Komlosi	TKO	4 (6), 2:05	5 July 2003	Anhalt Arena, Dessau, Germany	
14	Win	14–0	(United States) Sedreck Fields	SD	8 (8)	26 April 2003	Sport- und Kongresshalle, Schwerin, Germany	
13	Win	13–0	(Belarus) Raman Sukhaterin	UD	8 (8)	4 March 2003	Sala Sporturilor, Iași, Romania	
12	Win	12–0	(Brazil) Marcelo Ferreira dos Santos	TKO	3 (8)	18 January 2003	Grugahalle, Essen, Germany	
11	Win	11–0	(Slovakia) Ladislav Husarik	RTD	5 (6)	10 December 2012	Sala Sporturilor, Constanța, Romania	
10	Win	10–0	(Poland) Roman Bugaj	KO	3 (10)	23 November 2002	Westfalenhallen, Dortmund, Germany	Won vacant German International heavyweight title.
9	Win	9–0	(Nigeria) Sunday Abiodun	UD	6 (6)	14 September 2002	Volkswagen Halle, Braunschweig, Germany	
8	Win	8–0	(Slovakia) Ladislav Husarik	TKO	5	20 July 2002	Westfalenhallen, Dortmund, Germany	
7	Win	7–0	(Germany) Gene Pukall	TKO	1 (6)	6 April 2002	Universum Gym, Wandsbek, Germany	
6	Win	6–0	(Hungary) Alex Kosztopulosz	KO	1	16 March 2002	Hanns-Martin-Schleyer-Halle, Stuttgart, Germany	
5	Win	5–0	(Czech Republic) Daniel Jerling	KO	4 (6)	5 January 2002	Bördelandhalle, Magdeburg, Germany	
4	Win	4–0	(Poland) Piotr Jurczyk	TKO	1 (6)	8 December 2001	König Pilsener Arena, Oberhausen, Germany	
3	Win	3–0	(Hungary) Peter Boldan	TKO	1	29 September 2001	Universum Gym, Wandsbek, Germany	
2	Win	2–0	(Hungary) Ferenc Deak	TKO	1	28 July 2001	Estrel Convention Center, Neukölln, Germany	
1	Win	1–0	(Slovakia) Peter Simko	KO	1 (4)	16 June 2001	Kisstadion, Budapest, Hungary	Professional debut.
