= Cengiz Koç =

German boxer

Medal record

Men's amateur boxing

Representing Germany

European Championships
Bronze medal – third place	2000 Tampere	Super heavyweight

Cengiz Koç (born 9 September 1977 in Gronau, North Rhine-Westphalia) is a German heavyweight boxer of Turkish descent who won the bronze medal at the 2000 European amateur championships. He has also won a European championship in amateur kickboxing.

== Amateur ==
In Houston at the World championships 1999 he lost on points to eventual runner-up Kazakh Mukhtarkhan Dildabekov. At the European Championships 2000 he scored his biggest result in a third place after losing to Russian Alexei Lezin. At the Olympics he was spectacularly knocked cold in his first match by Cuban giant Alexis Rubalcaba.

== Pro ==
He turned pro afterwards but disappointed displaying little power and dedication. He lost to Michael Sprott, Paolo Vidoz and Timo Hoffmann.

== Titles ==
Amateur Boxing

- 2000 European Amateur Boxing Championships in Tampere, Finland (bronze) +91 kg

Amateur Kickboxing

- 1996 W.A.K.O. European Championships in Belgrade, Yugoslavia (gold) +91 kg (Low-Kick)

== Professional boxing record ==
24 Wins (15 knockouts, 9 decisions), 3 Losses (3 decisions)
Result	Record	Opponent	Type	Round	Date	Location	Notes
Win	22-1	(Germany) Rene Dettweiler	MD	8	30/08/2008	(Germany) Max-Schmeling-Halle, Prenzlauer Berg, Berlin	77-75, 77-75, 76-76.
Loss	35-4-1	(Germany) Timo Hoffmann	UD	10	04/11/2006	(Germany) RWE Rhein-Ruhr Sporthalle, Muelheim, North Rhine-Westphalia	94-97, 91-98, 93-96.
Loss	20-2	(Italy) Paolo Vidoz	UD	12	28/01/2006	(Germany) Tempodrom, Kreuzberg, Berlin	EBU Heavyweight Title. 112-117, 112-116, 112-117.
Win	9-1	(United States) Chris Lewallen	KO	1	01/10/2005	(Germany) EWE Arena, Oldenburg, Lower Saxony	Lewallen knocked out at 1:42 of the first round.
Win	29-27-1	(United States) Marcus Rhode	TKO	2	16/07/2005	(Germany) Nuremberg Arena, Nuremberg, Bavaria	Referee stopped the bout at 1:58 of the second round.
Loss	26-7	(United Kingdom) Michael Sprott	SD	10	23/04/2005	(Germany) Westfalenhallen, Dortmund, North Rhine-Westphalia	EBU Heavyweight Title. 95-96, 92-98, 96-94.
Win	37-5-1	(Argentina) Marcelo Fabian Dominguez	UD	8	18/12/2004	(Germany) Oberfrankenhalle, Bayreuth, Bavaria	77-75, 77-75, 78-74.
Win	7-1	(United States) Cerrone Fox	TKO	7	23/10/2004	(Germany) Tempodrom, Kreuzberg, Berlin	Referee stopped the bout at 0:27 of the seventh round.
Win	19-8-3	(United States) Terry McGroom	UD	6	24/07/2004	(Germany) Brandenburg Halle, Frankfurt, Brandenburg	
Win	11-16-1	(United States) Ramon Hayes	UD	8	17/04/2004	(Germany) Max-Schmeling-Halle, Prenzlauer Berg, Berlin	
Win	4-6	(United States) Jeff "Big Diesel" Ford	KO	3	28/02/2004	(Germany) Mehrzweckhalle, Dresden, Saxony	
Win	3-0	(Germany) Marcel Zeller	UD	6	22/11/2003	(Germany) Erdgas Arena, Riesa, Saxony	
Win	28-13	(United States) Thomas "Top Dawg" Williams	TKO	3	15/03/2003	(Germany) Max-Schmeling-Halle, Prenzlauer Berg, Berlin	
Win	12-4	(United States) Wade Lewis	KO	4	01/02/2003	(Germany) Eissportzentrum Chemnitz, Chemnitz, Saxony	
Win	6-8	(France) Thierry Guezouli	UD	6	16/11/2002	(Germany) Nuremberg Arena, Nuremberg, Bavaria	
Win	9-10	(South Africa) Hein van Bosch	TKO	5	28/09/2002	(Germany) Stadthalle, Zwickau, Saxony	
Win	40-11-4	(Belgium) Dirk Wallyn	TKO	2	24/08/2002	(Germany) Arena Leipzig, Leipzig, Saxony	
Win	1-3-1	(Hungary) Istvan Kecskes	TKO	2	01/06/2002	(Germany) Nuremberg Arena, Nuremberg, Bavaria	
Win	4-3	(Germany) Marco Heinichen	KO	1	27/04/2002	(Germany) Saxony Arena, Riesa, Saxony	
Win	12-2-1	(Poland) Roman Bugaj	SD	6	16/03/2002	(Germany) Bordelandhalle, Magdeburg, Saxony-Anhalt	
Win	6-2	(Hungary) Peter Boldan	KO	1	01/12/2001	(Germany) Westfalenhallen, Dortmund, North Rhine-Westphalia	
Win	8-10-1	(United States) George Chamberlain	TKO	2	01/09/2001	(Germany) Bordelandhalle, Magdeburg, Saxony-Anhalt	
Win	3-5	(United States) Anthony Abrams	KO	2	09/06/2001	(Germany) Nuremberg Arena, Nuremberg, Bavaria	
Win	9-6	(United States) Darrell Morgan	UD	4	21/04/2001	(Germany) Messehalle, Erfurt, Thuringia	
Win	0-3	(Turkey) Ergin Solmaz	TKO	2	24/03/2001	(Germany) Bordelandhalle, Magdeburg, Saxony-Anhalt	
Win	26-68-9	(United Kingdom) Nigel Rafferty	PTS	4	17/02/2001	(United Kingdom) York Hall, Bethnal Green, London	40-36.
Win	1-2	(United States) James Sealey	KO	1	27/01/2001	(Germany) Saxony Arena, Riesa, Saxony	
