= Aziz Jahjah =

Belgian-Moroccan heavyweight kickboxer

- Born: April 25, 1980 (age 46); Roosendaal, Netherlands
- Native name: زيز جهجه
- Other names: Boutahar ("Iceman")
- Nationality: Belgian; Moroccan
- Height: 1.92 m (6 ft 4 in)
- Weight: 103 kg (227 lb; 16.2 st)
- Division: Heavyweight
- Style: Muay Thai
- Fighting out of: Breda, Netherlands
- Team: Golden Glory (2004-present); Team Masseurs (-2003)
- Trainer: Cor Hemmers; Andre Masseurs
- Years active: 2001–present

Kickboxing record
- Total: 42
- Wins: 34
- By knockout: 24
- Losses: 8
- By knockout: 3
- Last updated on: July 9, 2009

Aziz "Boutahar" Jahjah (Arabic: زيز جهجه; born April 25, 1980) is a Belgian-Moroccan heavyweight kickboxer, fighting out of Golden Glory Gym in Breda, Netherlands. He is former WFCA Muay Thai World champion, currently fighting in K-1

== Titles ==
- 2004 Grand Tournoi de Kickboxing tournament champion
- 2003 WFCA Thaiboxing Heavyweight World title
- 2002 WFCA Thaiboxing -82 kg World title

== Professional kickboxing record ==
Kickboxing record
Date	Result	Opponent	Event	Location	Method	Round	Time
2009-06-27	Loss	(Netherlands) Brian Douwes	Ring Sensation RS1 Tournament	Rozenburg, Netherlands	Decision (unanimous)	3	3:00
2009-01-24	Win	(Montenegro) Goran Radonjić	Beast of the east	Zutphen, Netherlands	Decision (Unanimous)	3	3:00
2008-08-09	Loss	(Poland) Paul Slowinski	K-1 World GP 2008 in Hawaii	Hawaii	KO (Punches)	3	1:53
2008-05-31	Win	(Poland) Łukasz Jarosz	Beast of the east	Zutphen, Netherlands	TKO (Referee stoppage)	1	
2008-01-12	Loss	(Serbia) Nikola Dimkovski	Lord Of The Rings	Belgrade, Serbia	KO	3	
2007-12-05	Win	(Turkey) Errol Turgut	Marokko VS Turkije		KO		
2007-07-04	Win	(Switzerland) Björn Bregy	Balans Fight Night	Netherlands	TKO (Doctor stoppage)		
2006-12-09	Win	(Netherlands) Peter Mulder	Judgement Day	Roosendaal, Netherlands	KO	2	
2006-11-04	Loss	(Tunisia) Mourad Bouzidi	MSN Fightgala @ Delfzijl	Delfzijl, Netherlands	Decision (Unanimous)	5	3:00
2006	Win	(Thailand) Wanlop Sitpholek			KO	1	
2006-02-04	Loss	(Morocco) Samir Benazzouz	WFCA		KO	2	
2005-11-19	Win	(Belgium) Frédéric Sinistra	Westpoint Fight Night		TKO		
2005-07-02	Loss	(Serbia and Montenegro) Ivan Strugar	Le Grand Tournoi 2005, quarter finals	Paris, France	Decision	3	3:00
2005-03-19	Win	(Netherlands) Orlando Breinburg	Gentlemen Fight Night		KO	2	
2004-06-05	Win	(France) Frédérique Bellonie	La Finale Du Grand Tournoi, final	Paris, France	KO	2	
Wins "Grand Tournoi" 2004 Tournament.
2004-06-05	Win	(Serbia and Montenegro) Ivan Strugar	La Finale Du Grand Tournoi, semi finals	Paris, France	Decision	3	3:00
2004-06-05	Win	(Cuba) Alfredo Limonta	La Finale Du Grand Tournoi, quarter finals	Paris, France	KO	1	

== See also ==
- List of male kickboxers
- List of K-1 Events
- Indochinese kickboxing
