= Roman Bugaj =

Polish boxer (born 1973)

Personal information
- Nationality: (Poland) Polish
- Born: Roman Bugaj; 9 August 1973 (age 53) Kraków, Poland
- Height: 6 ft 3 in (1.91 m)
- Weight: heavyweight

Boxing career
- Stance: Orthodox

Boxing record
- Total fights: 25
- Wins: 16
- Win by KO: 9
- Losses: 8
- Draws: 1

Roman Bugaj (born 9 August 1973) is a Polish heavyweight boxer. Before turning to boxing he was an amateur kickboxer – winning a European title.

== Career ==
He turned professional in 1999. More than a third of his professional fights have been in the USA.

Among his opponents were Sinan Şamil Sam, Scott Gammer, Ruediger May and WBO cruiserweight title holder and British number 2 cruiserweight Enzo Maccarinelli.

== Titles/Accomplishments ==
Amateur Kickboxing

- 1996 W.A.K.O. European Championships in Belgrade, Serbia & Montenegro (gold) -86 kg (Full-Contact)
- 1996 W.A.K.O. European Championships in Belgrade, Serbia & Montenegro (silver) -89 kg (Light-Contact)

== Professional boxing record ==
16 Wins (9 knockouts, 7 decisions) 8 Losses (5 knockouts, 3 decisions), 1 Draw Archived April 18, 2014, at the Wayback Machine
| Result | Record | Opponent | Type | Round | Date | Location | Notes |
| Loss | 20-1 | (Wales) Enzo Maccarinelli | TKO | 1 | 4 Jun 2005 | (United Kingdom) Manchester Arena, Manchester] | Referee stopped the bout at 1:55 of the first round. |
| Loss | 39-3-3 | (Germany) Ruediger May | UD | 8 | 4 Dec 2004 | (Germany) Estrel Convention Center, Neukoeln, Berlin | 73-80, 72-80, 72-80. |
| Loss | 10-0-1 | (Wales) Scott Gammer | TKO | 2 | 5 Nov 2004 | (United Kingdom) Leisure Centre, Hereford, Herefordshire | Referee stopped the bout at 1:50 of the second round. |
| Win | 2-14-3 | (Slovakia) Marek Zelo | KO | 2 | 24 Sep 2004 | (Poland) Tarnowskie Góry | |
| Win | 1-9-1 | (Romania) Ioan Mihai | UD | 4 | 5 Jun 2004 | (Poland) Dąbrowa Górnicza | |
| Loss | 9-0 | (Romania) Constantin Onofrei | KO | 3 | 23 Nov 2002 | (Germany) Westfallenhalle, Dortmund, North Rhine-Westphalia | Germany International Heavyweight Title. |
| Loss | 14-0 | (Turkey) Sinan Samil Sam | KO | 5 | 20 Jul 2002 | (Germany) Westfallenhalle, Dortmund, North Rhine-Westphalia | |
| Win | 2-2-2 | (Hungary) Attila Huszka | TKO | 3 | 22 Jun 2002 | (Poland) Płock | |
| Win | 13-7 | (United States) David Washington | UD | 6 | 6 Apr 2002 | (Poland) Łódź | 59-56, 60-54, 60-56. |
| Loss | 7-0 | (Germany) Cengiz Koc | SD | 6 | 16 Mar 2002 | (Germany) Bordelandhalle, Magdeburg, Saxony-Anhalt | |
| Win | 1-1 | (Ukraine) Vladyslav Andreev | PTS | 6 | 24 Nov 2001 | (Poland) Łódź | |
| Win | 2-1 | (Czech Republic) Robert Sulgan | PTS | 4 | 27 Oct 2001 | (Poland) Pruszków, Warsaw | |
| Loss | 14-2 | (United States) Charles "Buddy" Hatcher | TKO | 5 | 20 Jul 2001 | (United States) Caesars Palace, Las Vegas, Nevada | Referee stopped the bout at 1:26 of the fifth round. |
| Draw | 6-0 | (United States) Donnell Wiggins | TD | 3 | 28 Apr 2001 | (United States) LaPorte Civic Center, LaPorte, Indiana | |
| Loss | 4-4-1 | (United States) Ron "Boogie Down" Brown | SD | 6 | 22 Feb 2001 | (United States) Harrisburg, Pennsylvania | |
| Win | 6-1 | (United States) Keith Govan | KO | 1 | 7 Sep 2000 | (United States) Teamster's Hall, Baltimore, Maryland | Govan knocked out at 1:18 of the first round. |
| Win | 3-1 | (United States) Alrick Lassiter | UD | 4 | 17 May 2000 | (United States) Hammerstein Ballroom, New York City | |
| Win | 7-11 | (United States) Kevin Rosier | UD | 4 | 2 Mar 2000 | (United States) Ramada Inn, Rosemont, Illinois | |
| Win | 3-6-1 | (United States) Ramon Hayes | UD | 4 | 2 Dec 1999 | (United States) Memorial Coliseum, Corpus Christi, Texas | 39-37, 40-36, 39-37. |
| Win | 1-5 | (United States) Curt Render | KO | 1 | 16 Sep 1999 | (United States) Grand Casino Biloxi, Biloxi, Mississippi | Render knocked out at 0:40 of the first round. |
| Win | -- | (United States) Mike Royster | TKO | 1 | 26 Aug 1999 | (United States) Atlanta | |
| Win | -- | (Cuba) Rafael Pedro | KO | 3 | 5 Aug 1999 | (United States) Grand Casino Tunica, Tunica, Mississippi | Pedro knocked out at 1:10 of the third round. |
| Win | 7-33-4 | (United Kingdom) Gary Williams | TKO | 4 | 17 Jul 1999 | (Poland) Gdańsk | |
| Win | -- | (Slovakia) Marian Kolpasky | TKO | 1 | 17 Apr 1999 | (Poland) Warsaw | |
| Win | -- | (United Kingdom) Iftikhab Ahmed | TKO | 1 | 26 Feb 1999 | (United Kingdom) Coventry Sports Centre, Coventry, West Midlands | |
