= W.A.K.O. European Championships 2000 (Jesolo) =

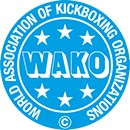
- The poster for W.A.K.O. European Championships 2000 (Jesolo)
- Promotion: W.A.K.O.
- Date: 18 October (Start); 22 October 2000 (End)
- Venue: Palasport Cornaro
- City: Jesolo, Italy

Event chronology
W.A.K.O. European Championships 2000 (Moscow)	W.A.K.O. European Championships 2000 (Jesolo)	W.A.K.O. World Championships 2001 (Maribor)

W.A.K.O. European Championships 2000 in Jesolo were the joint fifteen European kickboxing championships (the other was held in Moscow the same year) hosted by the W.A.K.O. organization and the sixth championships (world and European) to be held in Italy. The event was open to amateur men and women from across Europe and there were three styles on offer; Low-Kick (men only), Light-Contact and Semi-Contact. By the end of the championships the most successful nation was the hosts Italy, followed by Hungary in second and Kyrgyzstan in third. The event was held over five days at the Palasport Cornaro in Jesolo, Italy starting on Wednesday, 18 October and ending on Sunday, 22 October 2000.

== Low-Kick ==
Low-Kick is similar to Full-Contact kickboxing except that it allows kicks below the knee. Matches are usually resolved by a point's decision or referee stoppage and as is common in amateur kickboxing, both fighters have to wear head and body protection – more detail on Low-Kick rules can be found at the W.A.K.O. website. At Jesolo the style was open to men only, with there being twelve weight classes ranging from 51 kg/112.2 lbs to over 91 kg/+200.2 lbs. The most notable winner was Ivan Strugar who won his fifth gold medal at an amateur W.A.K.O. championships. Kyrgyzstan was the top nation in Low-Kick winning four golds, one silver and two bronze medals.

=== Men's Low-Kick Kickboxing Medals Table ===
Event	Gold	Silver	Bronze
Light Bantamweight -51 kg	Sinisa Marinkovic (Serbia and Montenegro)	Gianpiero Marceddu (Italy)	Utkir Hudoyarov (Kyrgyzstan); Alberto Costa (Portugal)
Bantamweight -54 kg	Igor Pavlenko (Ukraine)	Mariusz Cieśliński (Poland)	Mirbek Suyumbaev (Kyrgyzstan); Francesco De Luca (Italy)
Featherweight -57 kg	Tafay Duyshekeev (Kyrgyzstan)	Evgeny Khil (Russia)	Pedro Marta (Portugal); Michele Iezzi (Italy)
Lightweight -60 kg	Viatcheslav Tislenko (Russia)	Nuno Neves (Portugal)	Oleksandr Kozachenko (Ukraine); Milisav Ilic (Serbia and Montenegro)
Light Welterweight -63.5 kg	Janbulat Amantaev (Kyrgyzstan)	Alexandre Pogorelov (Russia)	Hebojsa Marinkovic (Serbia and Montenegro); Ruslan Melnyk (Ukraine)
Welterweight -67 kg	Luca Lazzaro (Italy)	Isa Mambetov (Kyrgyzstan)	Enrique Martinez (Spain); Oliver Elisabeth (France)
Light Middleweight -71 kg	Konstantin Beloussov (Russia)	Carlos Tavares (France)	Ruslan Kovalenko (Ukraine); Kanatbek Sydygaliev (Kyrgyzstan)
Middleweight -75 kg	Ivan Strugar (Serbia and Montenegro)	Oleg Outenine (Russia)	Davyd Dzhydzhelava (Ukraine); David Dancrade (France)
Light Heavyweight -81 kg	Drazenko Ninic (Serbia and Montenegro)	Aslanbek Dychekov (Russia)	Istvan Denes (Hungary); Anatoliy Dudchenko (Ukraine)
Cruiserweight -86 kg	Anuar Ibraev (Kyrgyzstan)	Dmitri Vorobjov (Estonia)	Leonid Mironenko (Ukraine); Vassili Komakov (Russia)
Heavyweight -91 kg	Ruslan Avasov (Kyrgyzstan)	Tugomir Gruica (Croatia)	Darko Milasinovic (Serbia and Montenegro); Tibor Nagy (Hungary)
Super Heavyweight +91 kg	Ivan Rudan (Croatia)	Mirko Vlahovic (Serbia and Montenegro)	Yevgeni Orlov (Russia); Dejan Mitrovski (North Macedonia)

== Light-Contact ==
Light-Contact is a form of kickboxing that is less physical than Full-Contact but more so than Semi-Contact and is often seen as a stepping stone between the two. Fighters score points on the basis of speed and technique over brute force although stoppages can occur, and as with other amateur kickboxing styles head and body protection must be worn – more detail on Light-Contact rules can be found on the official W.A.K.O. website. The men had nine weight divisions in the style ranging from 57 kg/125.4 lbs to over 94 kg/+206.8 lbs while the women had six ranging from 50 kg/110 lbs to over 70 kg/154 lbs. Notable winners at Jesolo included Dawid Kowalski, Martin Albers and Michal Wszelak who had all won gold medals at the last world championships in Caorle. By the end of the championships Hungary was the most successful nation in Light-Contact, winning four gold medals, two silver and four bronze.

=== Men's Light-Contact Kickboxing Medals Table ===
Event	Gold	Silver	Bronze
-57 kg	Fouad Habbani	Dezso Debreczeni	Danijel Mrkoci
-63 kg	Dawid Kowalski	Egidio Carsana	Robert Arvai
-69 kg	Youseff Lattaoui	Marcel Fekonja (Slovenia)	Gianluca Manca (Italy); Vitaliy Piatetsky (Ukraine)
-74 kg	Paul Lynch	Rafal Petertil	Sergey Androssiou
-79 kg	Zoltan Dancso	Vadym Pikiner	Darren Duncan
-84 kg	Martin Albers	Bogumil Polonski	Jozsef Jorcsak
-89 kg	Dirk Kindl	Yohann Lemaire	Marek Marszal
-94 kg	Salim Mohamed	Dmitry Gerasimov	Toni Turk
+94 kg	Emmanuel Mendy	Alex Melcher	Wojciech Szczerbiński

=== Women's Light-Contact Kickboxing Medals Table ===
Event	Gold	Silver	Bronze
-50 kg	Szilvia Csicsely (Hungary)	Renate Sandland (Norway)	Ioulia Trofimova (Russia); Julita Tkaczyk (Poland)
-55 kg	Agnes Tapai (Hungary)	Edyta Olewniczak (Poland)	Rada Matsonen (Russia); Andrea Rzehak (Germany)
-60 kg	Marzia Davide (Italy)	Monika Florek (Poland)	Sanja Stunja (Croatia); Margaryta Dyadyk (Ukraine)
-65 kg	Ivett Pruzsinszky (Hungary)	Suzana Stunja (Croatia)	Annamaria Sisonna (Italy); Saida Gasanova (Ukraine)
-70 kg	Larysa Berezenko (Ukraine)	Marijana Birin (Croatia)	Annalisa Ghiladri (Italy); Szilvia Linezmayer (Hungary)
+70 kg	Kelly Zanini (Italy)	Viktoria Kovacs (Hungary)	Anja Renfordt (Germany); Biserka Siranovic (Croatia)

== Semi-Contact ==
Semi-Contact is a form of kickboxing in which fights were won by points given due to technique, skill and speed, with physical force limited and as with other forms of amateur kickboxing, head and body protection is worn – more information on Semi-Contact can be found on the W.A.K.O. website. As with Light-Contact the men had nine weight divisions ranging from 57 kg/125.4 lbs to over 94 kg/+206.8 lbs while the women had six ranging from 50 kg/110 lbs to over 70 kg/154 lbs. By the end of the championships Italy was by far the strongest nation in Semi-Contact picking up six golds, three silvers and two bronzes.

=== Men's Semi-Contact Kickboxing Medals Table ===
Event	Gold	Silver	Bronze
-57 kg	Dezső Debreczeni (Hungary)	Gianluca Scolari (Italy)	Rafal Kaluzny (Poland); Fouad Habbani (France)
-63 kg	Vasilis Tatiadis (Greece)	Andrea Misiani (Italy)	Rudolf Vrba (Czech Republic); Donald Kealy (Republic of Ireland)
-69 kg	Eirik Gunderson (Norway)	Richard Calixte (France)	Faton Redzas (North Macedonia); Mihaly Koszogovits (Hungary)
-74 kg	Roy Baker (Republic of Ireland)	Roman Martin (Switzerland)	Zvonimir Gribl (Croatia); Domenico De Marco (Italy)
-79 kg	Michel Decian (Switzerland)	Zoltan Dancso (Hungary)	Igor Sharov (Ukraine); Stelios Polites (Greece)
-84 kg	Peter Edwards (United Kingdom)	Ozcan Arslan (Turkey)	Valeriy Drevilo (Ukraine); Christian Bazdaric (Latvia)
-89 kg	Peter Csikos (Hungary)	Clifton Finlay (United Kingdom)	David Tarpey (Republic of Ireland); Roberto Montuoro (Italy)
-94 kg	Giuseppe Fracaroli (Italy)	Halis Arslan (Turkey)	Laszlo Toth (Hungary); Andreas Mohr (Germany)
+94 kg	Marco Culiersi (Italy)	Karl-Heinz Kohl Brenner (Germany)	Emmanuel Mendy (France); Paul Coffey (Republic of Ireland)

=== Women's Semi-Contact Kickboxing Medals Table ===
Event	Gold	Silver	Bronze
-50 kg	Samantha Aquilano (Italy)	Krisztina Poropszki (Hungary)	Veronique Legras (France); Katarzyna Nowak (Poland)
-55 kg	Gloria De Bei (Italy)	Agnes Tapai (Hungary)	Gonca Thurm (Germany); Maria Pia Litvinova (Russia)
-60 kg	Luisa Lico (Italy)	Melanie Moder (Germany)	Lin Sissel Archer (Norway); Jana Moravcova (Czech Republic)
-65 kg	Anita Madsen (Norway)	Emanuela Amisani (Italy)	Anastasiya Savinova (Ukraine); Adriane Doppler (Germany)
-70 kg	Anna Megliaccio (Italy)	Marijana Birin (Croatia)	Lenka Klofacova (Czech Republic); Szilvia Linczmayer (Hungary)
+70 kg	Nadya Sibila (Slovenia)	Nicola Corbett (Republic of Ireland)	Kateryna Chernetska (Ukraine); Viktoria Kovacs (Hungary)

== Overall Medals Standing (Top 5) ==
Ranking	Country	Gold (gold)	Silver (silver)	Bronze (bronze)
1	Italy	9	5	9
2	Hungary	6	5	10
3	Kyrgyzstan	4	1	2
4	France	3	3	6
5	Serbia and Montenegro	3	1	3

== See also ==
- List of WAKO Amateur European Championships
- List of WAKO Amateur World Championships
