= Ivan Strugar =

Montenegrin kickboxer (born 1974)

- Born: December 18, 1974 (age 51); Podgorica, Montenegrin SR, Yugoslavia
- Nationality: (Montenegro)
- Height: 1.87 m (6 ft 1 1/2 in)
- Weight: 88 kg (194 lb; 13.9 st)
- Division: Cruiserweight
- Style: Kickboxing
- Fighting out of: Ariston
- Team: Ariston
- Trainer: Predrag Lekić
- Years active: 20 (1990-present)

Kickboxing record
- Total: 61
- Wins: 55
- By knockout: 28
- Losses: 6

Amateur record
- Total: 102
- Wins: 94
- By knockout: 24
- Losses: 8

Other information
- University: Oxford
- Website: http://www.ivanstrugar.me/

Ivan Strugar (born December 18, 1974) is a Montenegrin kickboxer. He is a winner of numerous trophies and accolades both in amateur and professional competition, and is one of the most popular sportsmen in Montenegro. He currently fights in W.A.K.O Pro association, out of Ariston gym in Podgorica. He won his last match in Podgorica. He fought Beloni third time in his career, and lost the fight by third-round knockout.

== Personal life ==
Strugar declares himself as Yugoslav, entering the ring in shirt with inscription Yugoslavia and FR Yugoslavia emblem, the same shirt he wore at W.A.K.O. European Championships 1996, where he won gold medal and entered the ring in same shirt since then, always accompanied by the song Eye of the Tiger.

== Titles ==
=== Professional competition ===
- 2014 W.A.K.O. Pro Low Kick Rules Heavyweight World Champion -88,6 kg.
- 2010 W.A.K.O. Pro Low Kick Rules Heavyweight World Champion -88,6 kg. (1 title def.)
- 2009 W.A.K.O. Pro Low Kick Rules Cruises Light Heavyweight World Champion -85,1 kg. (1 title def.)
- 2007 W.A.K.O. Pro Low Kick Rules Cruises Light Heavyweight World Champion -85,1 kg.
- 2003 Kings Of The Ring - Oriental Kickboxing Rules Super World Champion -85 kg.
- 2002 W.A.K.O. Pro Low Kick Rules Light Heavyweight World Champion -81,4 kg.
- 2001 W.A.K.O. Pro Low Kick Rules Super Middleweight World Champion -78.1 kg.
- 1998 W.A.K.O. Pro Low Kick Rules Middleweight World Champion -75 kg.

=== Amateur competition ===
- 2001 W.A.K.O. World Championships in Belgrade, Serbia & Montenegro (gold) -81 kg (Low-Kick)
- 2000 W.A.K.O. European Championships in Jesolo, Italy (gold) -75 kg (Low-Kick)
- 1999 W.A.K.O. World Championships in Bishkek, Kyrgyzstan (gold) -75 kg
- 1998 W.A.K.O. European Championships in Kyiv, Ukraine (gold) -75 kg
- 1996 W.A.K.O. European Championships in Belgrade, Serbia & Montenegro (gold) -71 kg (Low-Kick)
- 1995 W.A.K.O. World Championships in Kyiv, Ukraine (silver) -71 kg
- 1994 W.A.K.O. European Championships in Lisbon, Portugal (gold) -71 kg

=== Accolades ===
- 1999 Best sportsman of Podgorica
- 1996 Best sportsman of Montenegro
- 1995, 1998, 1999, 2000, 2001 among ten best sportsmen of Federal Republic of Yugoslavia

== Kickboxing record ==
Professional kickboxing record
Date	Result	Opponent	Event	Location	Method	Round	Time
2014-03-07	Win	(Russia) Kiril Ivanov	Splendid Grand Prix 6	Budva, Montenegro	Decision (Unanimous)	5	3:00
Wins WAKO Pro low kick rules heavyweight world title -88,6 kg.
2012-06-16	Loss	(France) Frédérique Bellonie	W.A.K.O. Pro GP Serbia vs Russia	Belgrade, Serbia	TKO	3	
For WAKO Pro low kick rules heavyweight world title -88,6 kg.
2011-12-16	Win	(France) Yassine Ahaggan	Splendid Grand Prix 5	Budva, Montenegro	Decision (Unanimous)	5	3:00
2011-04-15	Loss	(France) Frédérique Bellonie	Strugar - Bellonie	Podgorica, Montenegro	Decision (Split)	5	3:00
Lost WAKO Pro low kick rules heavyweight world title -88,6 kg.
2010-12-17	Win	(Russia) Alan Kotsoev	Splendid Grand Prix 2010	Budva, Montenegro	KO (Right High Kick)	5	
Retains WAKO Pro low kick rules heavyweight world title -88,6 kg.
2010-06-10	Win	(Netherlands) Cedrick Copra	Meč za titulu profesionalnog šampiona svijeta	Bijelo Polje, Montenegro	Decision (Unanimous)	5	3:00
Wins WAKO Pro low kick rules heavyweight world title -88,6 kg.
2009-12-11	Win	(Turkey) Mehmet Özer	Grand Prix Budva	Budva, Montenegro	TKO (Retirement)	4	
Retains WAKO Pro low kick rules cruses light heavyweight world title -85,1 kg.
2009-05-26	Win	(Bosnia and Herzegovina) Salko Zildžić	Konačni Obračun	Podgorica, Montenegro	KO (Right High Kick)	4	
Wins WAKO Pro low kick rules cruses light heavyweight world title -85,1 kg.
2008-12-12	Win	(France) Hassan Boau	Splendid Grad Prix 2	Budva, Montenegro	Decision (Unanimous)	5	3:00
2008-05-09	Loss	(Bosnia and Herzegovina) Salko Zildžić	Strugar - Zildžić 2	Tuzla, Bosnia and Herzegovina	KO (Left Hook)	4	
Lost WAKO Pro low kick rules cruses light heavyweight world title -85,1 kg.
2007-12-15	Win	(Bosnia and Herzegovina) Salko Zildžić	Strugar - Zildžić 1	Budva, Montenegro	Decision (Unanimous)	5	3:00
Wins WAKO Pro low kick rules cruses light heavyweight world title -85,1 kg.
2007-07-05	Win	(Russia) Oleg Utenin		Budva, Montenegro	Decision (Unanimous)	5	3:00
Retains WAKO Pro low kick rules light heavyweight world title -81,4 kg.
2007-04-14	Win	(Ukraine) Vladimir Mitjakin		Podgorica, Montenegro	KO (Right High Kick)	5	
2006-06-02	Win	(Bosnia and Herzegovina) Draženko Ninić		Novi Sad, Serbia	Decision (Unanimous)	12	2:00
Retains WAKO Pro low kick rules light heavyweight world title -81,4 kg.
2006-04-07	Win	(Bosnia and Herzegovina) Draženko Ninić	Noć Šampiona	Banja Luka, Bosnia and Herzegovina	Decision (Split)	12	2:00
Retains WAKO Pro low kick rules light heavyweight world title -81,4 kg.
2005-07-02	Loss	(France) Frédérique Bellonie	Le Grand Tournoi 2005, Semi finals	Paris, France	Decision	3	3:00
2005-07-02	Win	(Morocco) Aziz Jahjah	Le Grand Tournoi 2005, Quarter finals	Paris, France	Decision	3	3:00
2005-06-04	Win	(Thailand) Leonard Sitpholek	Kings Of The Ring: Mission Impossible, Final	Zagreb, Croatia	KO	2	
Qualifies for Grand Tournoi 2005.
2005-06-04	Win	(Czech Republic) Jiří Jaroš	Kings Of The Ring: Mission Impossible, Semi Finals	Zagreb, Croatia	Decision	3	3:00
2004-06-05	Loss	(Morocco) Aziz Jahjah	La Finale Du Grand Tournoi, Semi finals	Paris, France	Decision (Split)	3	3:00
2004-06-05	Win	(France) Aurélien Duarte	La Finale Du Grand Tournoi, Quarter finals	Paris, France	Decision (Unanimous)	3	3:00
2003-12-13	Win	(France) Aurélien Duarte	Kings Of The Ring	Milan, Italy	Decision (Unanimous)	5	3:00
Wins Kings Of The Ring oriental kickboxing rules super world champion -85 kg.
2002-?-?	Win	(Brazil) Gerson Teixeira					
Wins WAKO Pro low kick rules light heavyweight world title -81,4 kg.
2001-?-?	Win	(France) Eric Perros					
Wins WAKO Pro low kick rules super middleweight world title -78.1 kg.
1998-?-?	Win	(Italy) Daniele Petroni					
Wins WAKO Pro low kick rules middleweight world title -75 kg.
1996-01-22	Win	(Serbia and Montenegro) Milovan Dašić		Cetinje, Yugoslavia			
Professional debout.
Legend: Win Loss Draw/No contest Notes

== See also ==
- List of male kickboxers
