= Alexander Petkovic =

German boxer

Personal information
- Nickname: Alex
- Nationality: German
- Born: Alexander Slaviša Petković; 31 May 1980 (age 46) Munich, West Germany
- Height: 6 ft 3.5 in (1.92 m)
- Weight: Heavyweight

Boxing career
- Stance: Orthodox

Boxing record
- Total fights: 58
- Wins: 50
- Win by KO: 27
- Losses: 4
- Draws: 4

Alexander Petkovic (born 31 May 1980, Munich, West Germany) is a German professional boxer of Bosnian descent. He challenged once for the WBO world cruiserweight title in 2003.

== Career ==
Petkovic made his pro debut in 1997 as a cruiserweight and went undefeated in 31 fights before losing to Johnny Nelson in his challenge for the WBO Cruiserweight title. Since then he's only lost three other fights in the cruiserweight division, including a loss to fellow German Firat Arslan in a WBO Inter-Continental cruiserweight title fight.

== Professional boxing record ==
50 Wins (27 knockouts, 22 decisions), 4 Losses (3 knockouts, 1 decision), 4 Draws
Result	Record	Opponent	Type	Round	Date	Location	Notes
Win	26-17-3	(Kenya) Raymond Ochieng	TD	10 (12)	24/01/2015	ASV Halle, Dachau, Bayern, Germany	Win WBA International heavyweight title
Win	16-0-0	(Croatia) Marino Goles	RTD	3 (12)	10/05/2014	Europahalle, Karlsruhe, Baden-Württemberg, Germany	Retainet Global Boxing Union World heavyweight title
Win	11-4-0	(Tanzania) Chupaki Chipindi	KO	4 (12)	31/11/2013	ASV Halle, Dachau, Bayern, Germany	Retainet Global Boxing Union World heavyweight title
Win	40-8-2	(Germany) Timo Hoffmann	UD	12	11/05/2013	Ufgauhalle, Karlsruhe, Baden-Württemberg, Germany	Retainet Global Boxing Union World heavyweight title
Win	0-0-0	(Bosnia and Herzegovina) Senad Hadzic	TKO	2 (8)	09/03/2013	CU Arena, Hamburg, Germany	
Win	26-14-2	(Bosnia and Herzegovina) Adnan Buharalija	TKO	2 (12)	15/12/2012	Rheinstetten, Baden-Württemberg, Germany	Retainent Global Boxing Union World heavyweight title
Win	7-12-0	(Germany) Muhammed Ali Durmaz	TKO	1 (8)	14/07/2012	Impact Gym, Munich, Bayern, Germany	
Win	8-8-0	(Austria) Patrick Berger	TKO	2 (12)	21/04/2012	Hotel Marsoel, Chur, Switzerland	vacant Global Boxing Union World heavyweight title
Win	5-25-3	(Turkey) Ergin Solmaz	RTD	2	03/03/2012	Munich, Bayern, Germany	
Win	24-17-2	(Mali) Cisse Salif	DQ	6	14/10/2011	Obertraubling, Bayern, Germany	WBA International Heavyweight Title.
Win	24-16-1	(Tanzania) Joseph "Hungry Lion" Marwa	UD	12	20/05/2011	Munich, Bayern, Germany	IBF East/West Europe Heavyweight Title. 117-110, 118-109, 118-109.
Draw	39-7-1	(Germany) Timo Hoffmann	MD	12	23/10/2010	Riesa, Sachsen, Germany	WBO European Heavyweight Title. 115-113, 114-114, 114-114.
Win	0-4-1	(United States) Jermaine Bland	TKO	4	30/05/2010	Ingolstadt, Bayern, Germany	
Win	1-10-1	(Romania) Tani Dima	PTS	6	13/05/2010	Munich, Bayern, Germany	
Win	1-9-1	(Romania) Tani Dima	TKO	3	10/04/2010	Augsburg, Bayern, Germany	
Win	3-16-2	(Turkey) Ergin Solmaz	TKO	2	21/12/2009	Munich, Bayern, Germany	Referee stopped the bout at 2:19 of the second round.
Win	6-1	(Netherlands) Harry Duiven, Jr.	UD	6	10 Mar 2007	Mannheim, Baden-Württemberg, Germany	59-56, 58-56, 60-54.
Win	2-32-1	(Czech Republic) Rudolf Murko	TKO	2	09/02/2007	Munich, Bayern, Germany	Referee stopped the bout at 2:25 of the second round.
Win	10-27	(Turkey) Bruce Oezbek	KO	2	14/10/2006	Dvorana Borik, Bosnia and Herzegovina	WFC Intercontinental Cruiserweight Title.
Loss	28-4-2	(France) Kamel Amrane	KO	9	24/01/2006	Wandsbek, Hamburg, Germany	Petkovic knocked out at 2:57 of the ninth round.
Win	12-1	(Ukraine) Vadym Safonov	UD	8	02/07/2005	Altona, Hamburg, Germany	77-75, 78-74, 77-75.
Win	33-15	(Brazil) Roberto Coelho	UD	8	07/05/2005	Braunschweig, Niedersachsen, Germany	79-72, 80-71, 80-71.
Loss	21-3-1	(Turkey) Firat Arslan	TKO	7	18/01/2005	Cuxhaven, Niedersachsen, Germany	WBO Intercontinental Cruiserweight Title.
Win	10-5	(Czech Republic) Robert Sulgan	UD	8	16/11/2004	Cuxhaven, Niedersachsen, Germany	77-75, 80-72, 80-72.
Win	40-9	(United States) "Dangerous" Damon Reed	UD	8	18/09/2004	Leverkusen, Nordrhein-Westfalen, Germany	80-72, 80-72, 80-72.
Loss	11-5-2	(South Africa) Baldwin "Black Stone" Hlongwane	TKO	8	14/02/2004	Stuttgart, Baden-Württemberg, Germany	
Loss	42-12-2	(United Kingdom) Johnny "Entertainer" Nelson	MD	12	15/11/2003	Bayreuth, Bayern, Germany	WBO World Cruiserweight Title. 113-115, 113-115, 114-114.
Win	12-5-1	(Argentina) Sergio Martin Beaz	UD	8	30/08/2003	Munich, Bayern, Germany	80-72, 80-72, 79-73.
Win	37-5-3	(France) Alain Simon	TKO	9	29/03/2003	Altona, Hamburg, Germany	WBC International Cruiserweight Title.
Win	13-9-1	(Estonia) Valeri Semiskur	TKO	2	08/02/2003	Neukoeln, Berlin, Germany	
Win	7-6-1	(United States) John "Battleship" Battle	TKO	6	7 Dec 2002	Las Vegas, Nevada, United States	Referee stopped the bout at 2:02 of the sixth round.
Win	3-52-3	(Hungary) Csaba Olah	TKO	5	05/10/2002	Debrecen, Hungary	Referee stopped the bout at 2:08 of the fifth round.
Draw	34-2	(Germany) Ruediger May	PTS	12	20/07/2002	Dortmund, Nordrhein-Westfalen, Germany	WBC/German International Cruiserweight Titles.
Win	10-23-3	(United States) Eric "The Red" French	TKO	4	20/04/2002	Gdańsk, Poland	
Win	2-49-3	(Hungary) Csaba Olah	PTS	8	08/02/2002	Braunschweig, Niedersachsen, Germany	
Win	20-10-1	(Czech Republic) Milan Konecny	TKO	5	24/11/2001	Wandsbek, Hamburg, Germany	German International Cruiserweight Title.
Win	2-47-3	(Hungary) Csaba Olah	TKO	4	29/09/2001	Wandsbek, Hamburg, Germany	
Win	3-7	(Ivory Coast) Henry Mobio	PTS	6	28/07/2001	Neukoeln, Berlin, Germany	
Win	2-2	(Brazil) Eduardo Franca	PTS	6	05/05/2001	Braunschweig, Niedersachsen, Germany	
Win	2-8	(Algeria) Mohamed Ali Bouraoui	TKO	2	24/03/2001	Munich, Bayern, Germany	
Win	19-16	(United States) Larry Prather	PTS	6	24/02/2001	Alsterdorf, Hamburg, Germany	
Win	9-14-1	(United States) Dennis "The Menace" McKinney	PTS	6	05/12/2000	Wandsbek, Hamburg, Germany	
Win	0-12	(Slovakia) Sylvester Petrovic	TKO	1	01/10/2000	Wandsbek, Hamburg, Germany	
Win	18-5	(France) Samuel Florimond	PTS	6	28/05/2000	Wandsbek, Hamburg, Germany	
Win	11-11-2	(France) Rene Janvier	PTS	6	18/03/2000	Alsterdorf, Hamburg, Germany	
Win	3-7	(United States) Zaire Patterson	TKO	4	19/02/2000	Neukoeln, Berlin, Germany	
Win	0-1	(Hungary) Laszlo Kovacs	TKO	4	23/10/1999	Frankfurt, Hessen, Germany	
Draw	10-1	(Germany) Silvio Meinel	PTS	6	18/09/1999	Stuttgart, Baden-Württemberg, Germany	
Win	3-11	(Hungary) Gabor Ott	KO	1	10/07/1999	Augsburg, Bayern, Germany	
Win	21-38-3	(Belgium) Yves Monsieur	PTS	4	24/04/1999	Munich, Bayern, Germany	
Win	1-4	(Slovakia) Julius Gal	PTS	4	13/02/1999	Stuttgart, Baden-Württemberg, Germany	
Win	2-14	(Hungary) Ignacio Orsola	KO	2	14/11/1998	Munich, Bayern, Germany	
Win	1-48	(Belgium) Frank Wuestenberghs	PTS	4	03/10/1998	Augsburg, Bayern, Germany	
Draw	1-8	(Germany) Timmy Punch	TD	3	10/07/1998	Munich, Bayern, Germany	
Win	1-44	(Belgium) Frank Wuestenberghs	PTS	4	02/05/1998	Lübeck, Schleswig-Holstein, Germany	
Win	2-15	(Democratic Republic of the Congo) Ferousi Ilunga	KO	1	30/01/1998	Munich, Bayern, Germany	
Win	16-22-1	(Belgium) Bruno Wuestenberghs	PTS	4	20/12/1997	Offenburg, Baden-Württemberg, Germany	
Win	1-21	(Hungary) Sandor Szakaly	KO	1	13/12/1997	Alsterdorf, Hamburg, Germany	
