= Rüdiger May =

German boxer (born 1974)

Ruediger May
Personal information
- Nationality: German
- Born: Rüdiger May; 26 November 1974 (age 51) Meerane, East Germany
- Height: 6 ft 5.5 in (1.97 m)
- Weight: cruiserweight

Boxing career
- Stance: Orthodox

Boxing record
- Total fights: 52
- Wins: 43
- Win by KO: 11
- Losses: 6
- Draws: 3
- No contests: 0

Ruediger May (born 26 November 1974 in Meerane, Saxony) is a prolific German cruiserweight boxer known for his stinging jab. He challenged once for the WBO world cruiserweight title in 2004.

== Professional ==
As an amateur May boxed in 76 fights, managing to win 55, before turning professional on 26 February 1994 at the age of 19. He boxed his first professional fight in San Jose, California, winning the bout against Fred Simmons, by unanimous decision.

He went on to win his first 24 pro fights before winning the German BDB cruiserweight title on 4 September 1999 with a points victory over Silvio Meinel. This was however followed by his first professional defeat at the hands of Turkish boxer Turan Bagci in Spain. After 2 successful title defenses against Michael Klötzsch and Firat Arslan, May was given a shot at the EBU (European) cruiserweight title in a bout against Ukraine's Alexander Gurov in 2001. Gurov had won the European cruiserweight championship belt from no other than May's brother, Torsten May, that same year. Rudiger lost the bout however by TKO in the 4th round, his second pro defeat.

In 2002 he boxed Alexander Petkovic, with both the WBC International cruiserweight title and German International cruiserweight title at stake. The fight ended in a disappointing draw. In 2003 however May won the vacant EBU-EU (European Union) cruiserweight title with a victory over Frenchman Frédéric Serrat. He managed 3 title defences before being given another shot at the EBU (European) cruiserweight title in 2004 against the holder Vincenzo Cantatore, a former Italian heavyweight champion and holder of the WBC International cruiserweight title. He boxed to another draw and the belt remained with Cantatore.

That same year May's promoter Wilfried Sauerland secured him a world championship fight with WBO title holder Johnny Nelson. May missed his opportunity though, losing the bout by TKO in the 7th round.

In April 2005 May fought Poland's Krzysztof Wlodarczyk for the vacated EBU-EU (European Union) cruiserweight title but was beaten by knockout in the tenth round. Due to an alleged lack of prospects in professional boxing, May's promoter Sauerland arranged a better matched duel for May against the emerging and then still undefeated Marco Huck. May lost the fight on points over ten rounds.

After a two-year break from boxing, May returned to the ring on 31 March 2007 in a successful comeback fight against Sven Hazel. After two more victories he was handed another world championship fight, this time against WBC International cruiserweight title holder Herbie Hide in March 2008. May lost the bout by technical knockout in the second round, Hide's power proving too much for May, despite his height advantage.

== Record ==
43 Wins (11 knockouts, 32 decisions), 6 Loss, 3 Draws
Res.	Opponent	Type	Rd.	Date	Venue	Location	Notes
Loss	(United Kingdom) Herbie Hide	TKO	2	11 March 2008	Maritim Hotel	Halle an der Saale, Germany	Bout for Hide's WBC International cruiserweight title
Win	(Latvia) Jevgenijs Andrejevs	Decision (Unanimous)	6	17 November 2007	Sporthalle "Neue Zeit"	Schwedt, Germany	
Win	(North Macedonia) Dzemail Skrijeli	KO	3	7 July 2007	Kölnarena	Cologne, Germany	
Win	(Germany) Sven Haselhuhn	TKO	6	31 March 2007	Olympiahalle	Munich, Germany	
Loss	(Bosnia and Herzegovina) Marco Huck	Decision (Unanimous)	10	3 September 2005	International Congress Center	Charlottenburg, Berlin, Germany	
Loss	(Poland) Krzysztof Wlodarczyk	KO	10	16 April 2005		Bydgoszcz, Poland	vacant EBU-EU (European Union) cruiserweight title
Win	(Poland) Roman Bugaj	Decision (Unanimous)	8	4 December 2004	Estrel Convention Center	Neukölln, Berlin, Germany	
Loss	(United Kingdom) Johnny Nelson	TKO	7	4 September 2004	Grugahalle	Essen, Germany	Bout for Nelson's WBO cruiserweight title
Draw	(Italy) Vincenzo Cantatore	Draw	12	5 June 2004	Chemnitz Arena	Chemnitz, Germany	Bout for Cantatore's EBU (European) cruiserweight title
Win	(United States) Nate Zeikle	KO	2	28 February 2004	Mehrzweckhalle	Dresden, Germany	
Draw	(Italy) Vincenzo Rossitto	Draw	10	22 November 2003	Erdgas Arena	Riesa, Germany	Retained EBU-EU (European Union) cruiserweight title
Win	(France) Alain Simon	Decision(Unanimous)	10	6 September 2003	Messehalle	Erfurt, Germany	Retained EBU-EU (European Union) cruiserweight title
Win	(Belgium) Ismail Abdoul	Decision(Unanimous)	10	31 May 2003	Brandenburg Halle	Frankfurt, Germany	Retained EBU-EU (European Union) cruiserweight title
Win	(France) Frédéric Serrat	TD	7	15 March 2003	Max Schmeling Halle	Berlin, Germany	Won the vacant EBU-EU (European Union) cruiserweight title
Win	(United States) Eric French	TKO	4	1 February 2003	Chemnitz Arena	Chemnitz, Germany	
Draw	(Bosnia and Herzegovina) Alexander Petkovic	Draw	12	20 July 2002	Westfalenhalle	Dortmund, Germany	WBC International cruiserweight title ~ German International cruiserweight title
Win	(Armenia) Vage Kocharyan	Decision (Unanimous)	8	27 April 2002	Sachsen Arena	Riesa, Germany	
Win	(Czech Republic) Vladislav Druso	Decision (Unanimous)	8	9 March 2002	Brandenburg Halle	Frankfurt, Germany	
Loss	(Ukraine) Alexander Gurov	TKO	4	1 December 2001	Westfalenhalle	Dortmund, Germany	Bout for Gurov's EBU (European) cruiserweight title
Win	(Algeria) Mohamed Ali Bouraoui	TKO	2	1 September 2001	Bördelandhalle	Magdeburg, Germany	
Win	(Turkey) Firat Arslan	Decision (Unanimous)	10	19 May 2001	Maritim Hotel	Cologne, Germany	Retained German BDB cruiserweight title
Win	(Ivory Coast) Henry Mobio	Decision(Unanimous)	8	24 March 2001	Bördelandhalle	Magdeburg, Germany	
Win	(Liberia) Lee Manuel Ossie	Decision	12	27 January 2001	Sachsen Arena	Riesa, Germany	
Win	(Algeria) Mohamed Ali Bouraoui	Decision(Unanimous)	8	16 December 2000	Europahalle	Karlsruhe, Germany	
Win	(Germany) Michael Kloetzsch	TKO	3	2 September 2000	Bördelandhalle	Magdeburg, Germany	Retained German BDB cruiserweight title
Win	(United Kingdom) Darron Griffiths	Decision	8	6 May 2000	Ballsporthalle	Frankfurt, Germany	
Loss	(Turkey) Turan Bagci	Decision	8	2 November 1999		Ciudad Real, Spain	
Win	(Germany) Silvio Meinel	Decision	10	4 September 1999		Meinsdorf, Brandenburg, Germany	Won German BDB cruiserweight title
Win	(Ghana) Francis Fofoh	Decision	8	8 May 1999	Philipshalle	Düsseldorf, Germany	
Win	(United Kingdom) Nigel Rafferty	Decision(Unanimous)	8	27 February 1999	Max-Schmeling-Halle	Berlin, Prenzlauer Berg, Germany	
Win	(United States) Matthew Charleston	Decision	6	5 December 1998		Cologne, Germany	
Win	(Belgium) Geert Blieck	Decision	6	10 October 1998		Vienna, Austria	
Win	(Netherlands) Marco van Spaendonck	Decision	6	23 March 1998	Max-Schmeling-Halle	Berlin, Prenzlauer Berg, Germany	
Win	(Czech Republic) Peter Hrivnak	Decision	6	6 December 1997		Neuwied, Germany	
Win	(United States) Stephen Brown	Decision	6	5 October 1997		Gera, Germany	
Win	(United Kingdom) Simon McDougall	Decision	6	1 June 1997		Riesa, Germany	
Win	(United States) Jerry Halstead	Decision	6	26 April 1997		Leipzig, Germany	
Win	(United States) Dan Kosmicki	Decision	6	22 March 1997	Max-Schmeling-Halle	Berlin, Prenzlauer Berg, Germany	
Win	(United States) Mike McGrady	Decision	6	7 December 1996		Vienna, Austria	
Win	(United Kingdom) Albert Call	Decision	6	19 October 1996	Zoo-Gesellschaftshaus	Frankfurt, Germany	
Win	(United States) Tim St Clair	TKO	5	25 May 1996	Neue Messehallen	Leipzig, Germany	
Win	(Slovakia) Slavomir Selicky	Decision	6	20 April 1996		Düsseldorf, Germany	
Win	(United States) Carlos Vásquez	KO	2	23 March 1996	Madison Square Garden	New York City, United States	
Win	(United States) Ed Mosley	KO	2	17 February 1996	Westfalenhalle	Dortmund, Germany	
Win	(United Kingdom) Cliff Elden	Decision	6	29 January 1996	Café Royal	Piccadilly, London, United Kingdom	
Win	(United States) Scott Lindecker	KO	1	3 November 1995	Zoo-Gesellschaftshaus	Frankfurt, Germany	
Win	(United States) Sean Gibbons	KO	4	9 September 1995	Seidenstickerhalle	Bielefeld, Germany	
Win	(United Kingdom) John Keeton	Decision (Unanimous)	6	11 February 1995	Festhalle Frankfurt	Frankfurt, Germany	
Win	(United Kingdom) Steve Osborne	Decision	6	26 November 1994		Wuppertal, Germany	
Win	(United Kingdom) Art Stacey	Decision	6	8 October 1994	Gerry Weber Stadion	Halle, North Rhine-Westphalia, Germany	
Win	(United Kingdom) Nicky Wadman	Decision	4	17 September 1994		Leverkusen, Germany	
Win	(United States) Fred Simmons	Decision (Unanimous)	4	26 February 1994	The Event Center Arena	San Jose, United States	pro debut

== Other information ==
His brother is Torsten May, who was also a boxer.

In 2008 May spent a period of time as David Haye's sparring partner in Hayes preparation for his title defence fight with Enzo Maccarinelli and May's preparation for his world championship showdown with Herbie Hide.
