= Timo Hoffmann =

German boxer

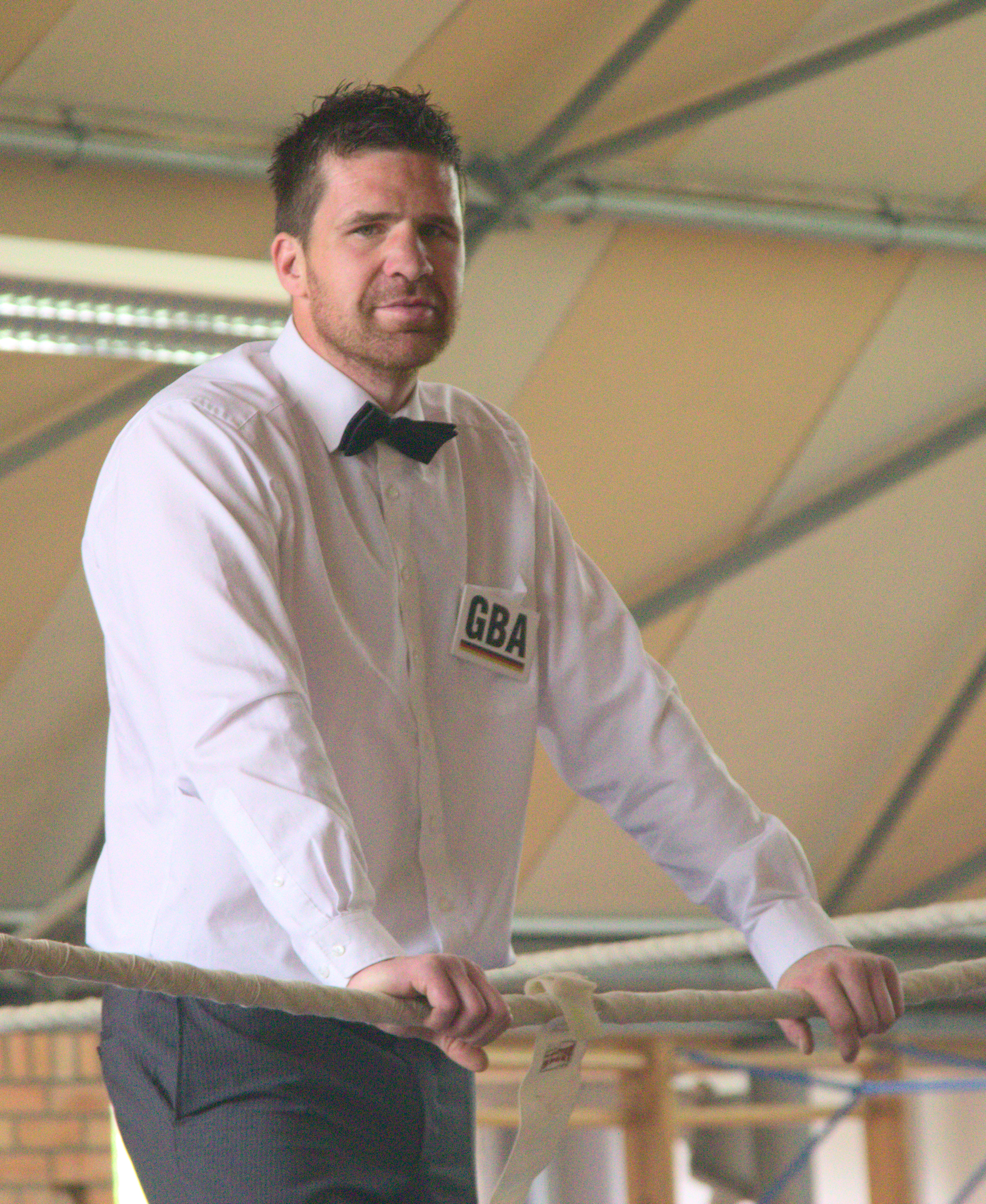

Personal information
- Nicknames: The Body; The German Oak
- Nationality: German
- Born: 25 September 1974 (age 51) Eisleben, East Germany
- Height: 2.02 m (6 ft 8 in)
- Weight: Heavyweight

Boxing career
- Stance: Orthodox

Boxing record
- Total fights: 52
- Wins: 40
- Win by KO: 23
- Losses: 9
- Draws: 2
- No contests: 1

Timo Hoffmann (born 25 September 1974) is a German professional boxer and multiple-time European heavyweight title challenger. He is perhaps best known as being the first fighter to have gone the full distance against Vitali Klitschko, who held at the time of their bout a record of 27 wins, 1 loss, and 27 knockouts. Between Klitschko's debut in November 1996 to December 2009 when Klitschko fought Kevin Johnson (boxer), Hoffmann was the only fighter who went the full distance with him. He holds notable wins over Corey Sanders, and Ross Puritty. He fought but did not beat the aforementioned Vitali Klitschko, Francois Botha and Henry Akinwande

== Amateur career ==
As an amateur Hoffman won a silver medal at the 1992 Junior European Championships in Edinburgh, Scotland and a bronze medal at the 1992 Junior World Championships in Montreal, Quebec, Canada and had 86 amateur fights.

== Professional career ==
Hoffman turned professional in 1997 and won his first 22 bouts. In 2000 he suffered his first loss to Vitali Klitschko but managed to go the full 12 rounds with the hard-hitting Ukrainian. This was the first and for nearly a decade a last occasion that someone went to the distance with Klitschko, until Kevin Johnson managed to achieve the same feat in late 2009. Hoffmann was then upset on his next fight by Michael Sprott.

Hoffmann never fought for a major world title throughout his career, but he held various smaller titles for some periods. His notable opponents included Henry Akinwande, Luan Krasniqi, Paolo Vidoz, Timor Ibragimov and Alexander Dimitrenko. He last fought Francois Botha in 2009 and lost the fight by split decision. His record as of December 2009 stands at 38 wins, 7 losses and one draw.

== Professional boxing record ==
40 Wins (23 knockouts, 17 decisions), 9 Losses (2 knockouts, 6 decisions), 2 Draws, 1 No Contest
Result	Record	Opponent	Type	Round	Date	Location	Notes
Loss	6-1-1	(United Kingdom) Ian Lewison	TKO	1	23/03/2013	(United Kingdom) London, England	Prizefighter Tournament, heavyweight quarter-final.
NC	16-2	(Germany) Steffen Kretschmann	NC	6	14/09/2011	Halle an der Saale, Germany	Stopped due to rain.
Win	22-22-2	(Germany) Jonathan Pasi	UD	12	03/12/2011	Dessau, Germany	
Draw	39-4-3	(Bosnia and Herzegovina) Alexander Petkovic	MD	12	23/10/2010	Riesa, Germany	WBO European Heavyweight Title.
Win	14-6-1	(Netherlands) Harry Duiven, Jr.	TKO	2	04/06/2010	Aschersleben, Germany	Referee stopped the bout at 1:59 of the second round.
Loss	46-4-2	(South Africa) Francois Botha	SD	12	15/05/2009	Magdeburg, Germany	WBFo Heavyweight Title.
Win	16-7-2	(Kenya) Raymond Ochieng	KO	4	10/10/2008	Barleben, Germany	Ochieng knocked out at 1:37 of the fourth round.
Loss	26-0	(Ukraine) Alexander Dimitrenko	TKO	12	17/11/2007	Magdeburg, Germany	WBO Intercontinental Heavyweight Title. Referee stopped the bout at 2:24 of the 12th round.
Loss	21-2-1	(Uzbekistan) Timur Ibragimov	UD	10	23/06/2007	Zwickau, Germany	
Win	19-3	(Romania) Constantin Onofrei	KO	4	03/03/2007	Rostock, Germany	Onofrei knocked out at 1:12 of the fourth round.
Win	23-2	(Turkey) Cengiz Koc	UD	10	04/11/2006	Muelheim, Germany	
Win	14-1	(Ghana) Abraham Okine	UD	8	22/04/2006	Mannheim, Germany	
Win	15-1	(United States) Tim Williamson	TKO	5	10/12/2005	Leipzig, Germany	Williamson could not come out for the fifth round.
Loss	18-2	(Italy) Paolo Vidoz	SD	12	11/06/2005	Kempten, Germany	EBU/IBF Intercontinental Heavyweight Title.
Win	25-13-2	(Croatia) Bob Mirovic	UD	12	12/03/2005	Zwickau, Germany	IBF Intercontinental Heavyweight Title.
Draw	27-1	(Germany) Luan Krasniqi	PTS	12	04/12/2004	Berlin, Germany	EBU Heavyweight Title.
Win	13-8	(United States) Tipton Walker	TKO	7	04/09/2004	Essen, Germany	
Win	30-11-1	(United States) Quinn Navarre	KO	2	17/04/2004	Berlin, Germany	
Win	23-9	(United States) Corey Sanders	UD	12	28/02/2004	Dresden, Germany	WBO Intercontinental Heavyweight Title.
Win	18-8-4	(United States) Zuri Lawrence	UD	12	22/11/2003	Riesa, Germany	
Loss	43-2-1	(United Kingdom) Henry Akinwande	SD	12	31/05/2003	Frankfurt, Germany	IBF Intercontinental Heavyweight Title.
Win	45-4	(United States) Don Steele	TKO	2	15/03/2003	Berlin, Germany	
Win	51-6	(United States) Dicky Ryan	TKO	8	28/09/2002	Zwickau, Germany	IBF Intercontinental Heavyweight Title.
Win	28-15-3	(United States) Ross Puritty	UD	12	01/06/2002	Nuremberg, Germany	IBF Intercontinental Heavyweight Title.
Win	13-0	(Russia) Balu Sauer	TKO	7	16/03/2002	Magdeburg, Germany	IBF Intercontinental/German International Heavyweight Titles.
Win	40-9-2	(United States) Troy Weida	TKO	1	01/12/2001	Dortmund, Germany	
Win	15-2	(United Kingdom) Michael Sprott	UD	8	24/03/2001	Magdeburg, Germany	
Loss	14-2	(United Kingdom) Michael Sprott	PTS	8	17/02/2001	(United Kingdom) London, England	
Loss	27-1	(Ukraine) Vitali Klitschko	UD	12	25/11/2000	Hannover, Germany	EBU Heavyweight Title.
Win	26-2-1	(Germany) Willi Fischer	UD	12	06/05/2000	Frankfurt, Germany	German BDB/International Heavyweight Titles.
Win	12-11-1	(United States) Jimmy Haynes	TKO	4	24/02/2000	(New York (state)) New York City, New York, U.S.	
Win	20-34-1	(United States) Everett Martin	PTS	8	29/01/2000	Riesa, Germany	
Win	36-4-1	(Germany) Mario Schiesser	KO	5	27/11/1999	Düsseldorf, Germany	German BDB Heavyweight Title.
Win	7-14-1	(United States) Bryant Smith	TKO	4	04/09/1999	Magdeburg, Germany	
Win	26-8-2	(France) Antoine Palatis	PTS	8	05/06/1999	Frankfurt, Germany	
Win	5-22-1	(Slovakia) Ladislav Husarik	TKO	6	17/04/1999	Cologne, Germany	
Win	10-3	(United States) Anthony Green	KO	2	05/12/1998	Cologne, Germany	
Win	2-9	(United States) Shane Hykes	KO	1	24/10/1998	Düsseldorf, Germany	
Win	15-25-1	(United States) Kimmuel Odum	TKO	2	10/10/1998	Vienna, Austria	
Win	16-16	(United Kingdom) Michael Murray	PTS	8	22/08/1998	Leipzig, Germany	
Win	5-5	(France) Yacine Kingbo	PTS	6	18/04/1998	Duisburg, Germany	
Win	3-4	(United States) Derrick Edwards	TKO	2	28/02/1998	Dortmund, Germany	
Win	21-23-2	(Canada) Conroy Nelson	TKO	1	11/01/1998	Riesa, Germany	
Win	10-6-1	(Austria) Biko Botowamungu	PTS	6	13/12/1997	Düsseldorf, Germany	
Win	16-25	(United States) Mike Dixon	TKO	2	02/11/1997	Halle, Germany	
Win	12-18	(United States) Nathaniel Fitch	PTS	6	05/10/1997	Gera, Germany	
Win	3-1	(United States) Tracy Wilson	TKO	4	30/08/1997	Berlin, Germany	
Win	10-27-3	(Hungary) Laszlo Paszterko	TKO	3	22/06/1997	Cologne, Germany	
Win	1-1	(Slovakia) Marcus Hurbanic	PTS	6	26/04/1997	Leipzig, Germany	
Win	8-25-1	(United States) Mike Robinson	PTS	6	13/04/1997	Cologne, Germany	
Win	--	(Germany) Hans Metzger	TKO	4	16/10/1993	Koblenz, Germany	
