= David Dancrade =

French heavyweight kickboxer

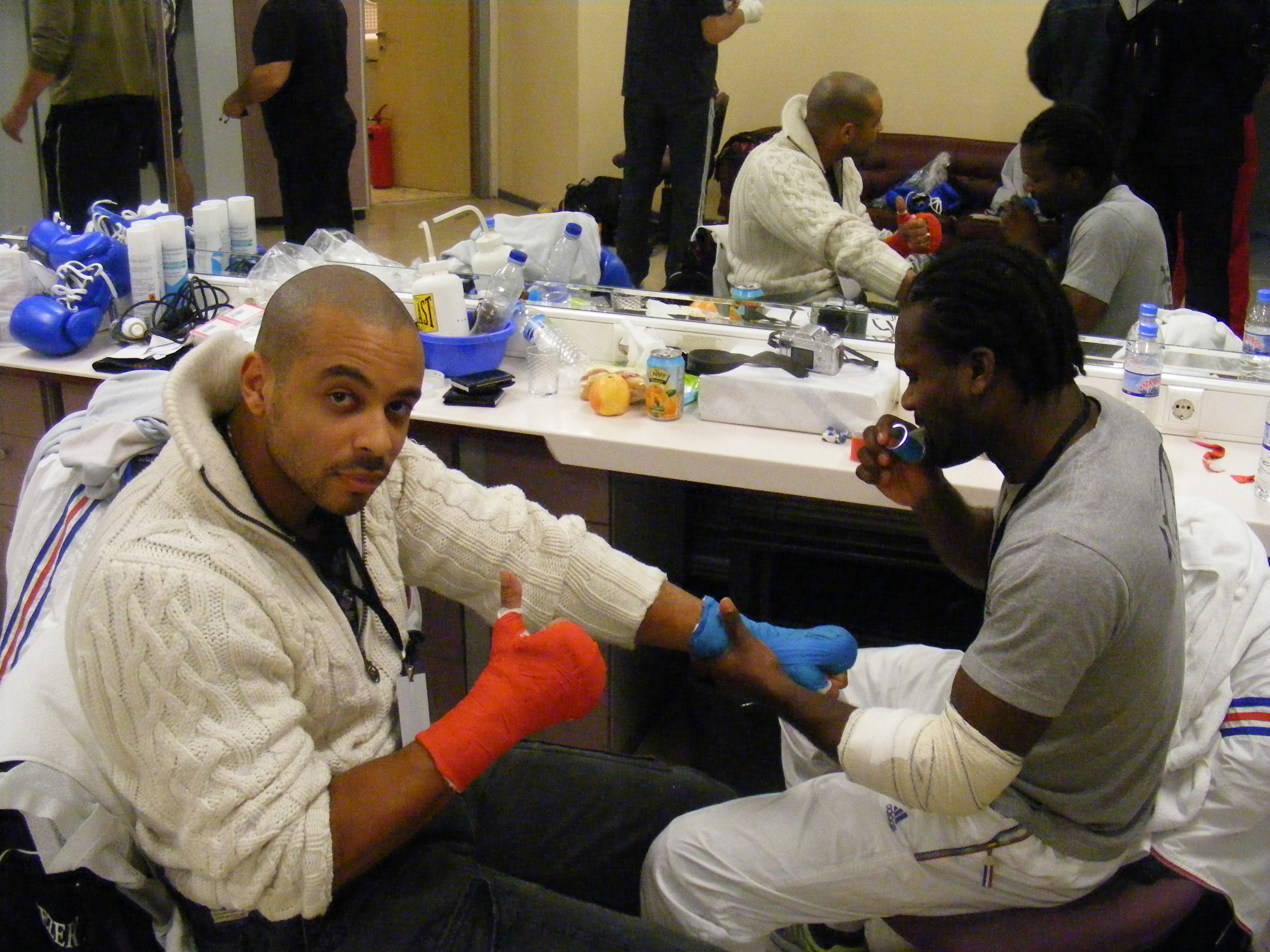
- Dancrade & his trainer R. Roudy
- Born: 18 January 1976 (age 50)
- Nationality: French
- Height: 1.87 m (6 ft 2 in)
- Weight: 96 kg (212 lb; 15.1 st)
- Division: Heavyweight
- Style: Boxing, Kickboxing, Muay Thai
- Team: Le Faucon Gym Boxing
- Trainer: Richard Roudy
- Years active: 1997–present

Kickboxing record
- Total: 54
- Wins: 48
- Losses: 6

David Dancrade (born 18 January 1976) is a French heavyweight kickboxer, fighting out of Bonneuil Muaythai Club and Faucon Gym, both based in France. Dancrade is the former boxing and muay thai champion of France. He made his K-1 debut at K-1 World Grand Prix 2007 Final, against Japanese kickboxer Musashi, in which he suffered a KO in the first round.

== Titles ==
- 2010 World Kickboxing vice Champion
- 2006 K-1 Fighting Network in Marseilles 3rd place
- 2004 French Muay Thai Champion
- 2003 French Muay Thai Champion
- 2002 WKA Amateur World Championships in Italy (silver)
- 2001 French Kickboxing Champion
- 2000 W.A.K.O. Amateur European Championships in Jesolo, Italy (bronze) −75 kg (Low-Kick)
- 2000 French Kickboxing Vice Champion (A Class)
- 1998 French Kickboxing Champion (B Class)
- 1997 French kickboxing Champion (C Class)

== See also ==
- Boxing
- List of K-1 events
- List of male kickboxers
