= Kisstadion =

Sports venue in Budapest, Hungary

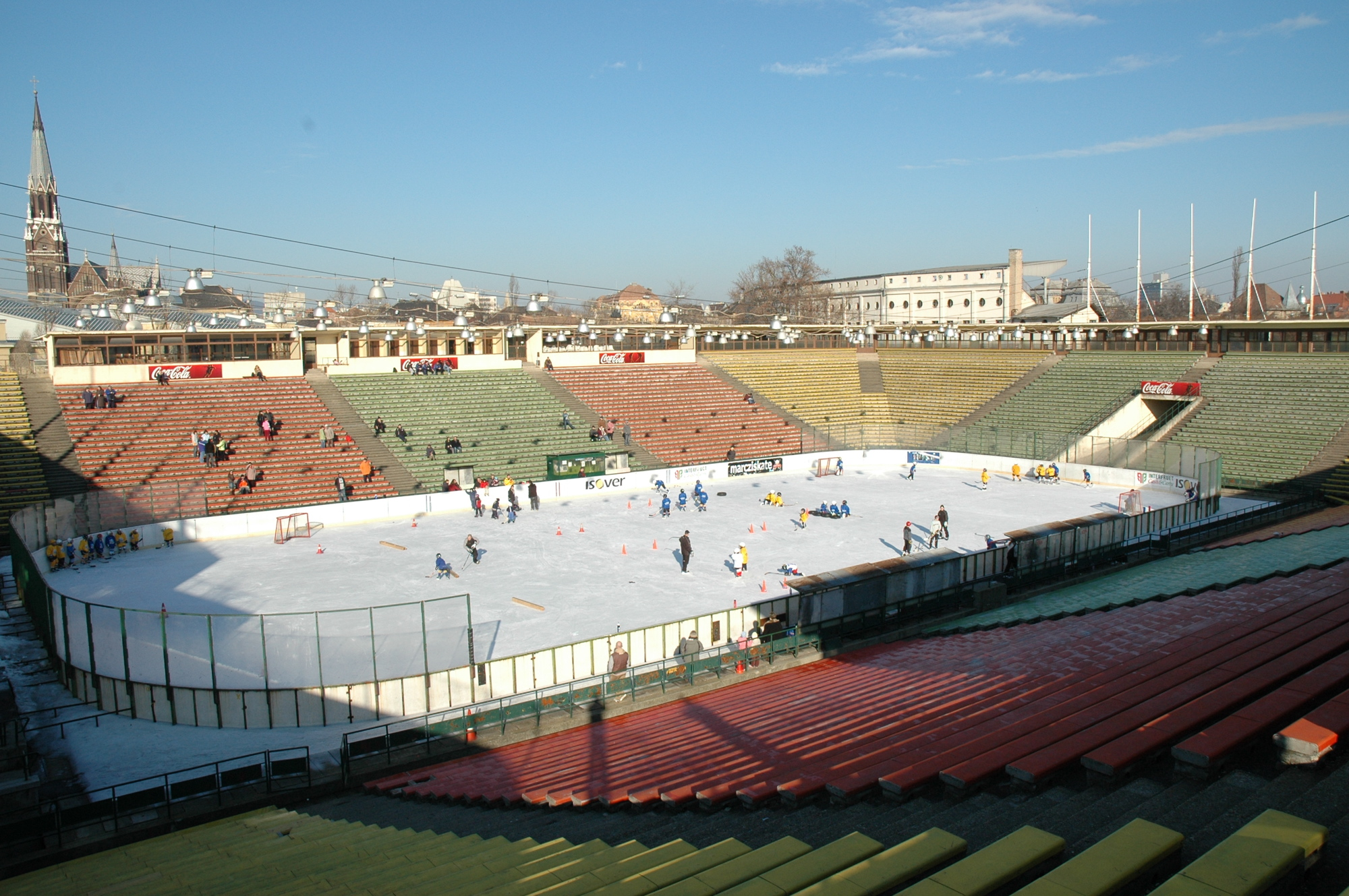
- Interactive map of Kisstadion
- Location: Budapest, Hungary
- Coordinates: 47°30′17.09″N 19°5′40.43″E
- Capacity: 14,000 (ice hockey); 16,800 (concerts)

Construction
- Groundbreaking: 1959
- Opened: 1961
- Renovated: 1988
- Cost: 22 million HUF

Kisstadion (lit. 'Small Stadium') is an outdoor stadium in Budapest, Hungary, which is primarily used for ice hockey, but due to its field dimensions, it is usable for any other sport except association football.

== History ==
The arena was opened in 1961 and was home of a number of national and international sport events, such as the 1963 European Figure Skating Championships, which was the last outdoor championship and 1964 Women's European Basketball Championship, and also hosted Davis Cup matches and other shows and concerts.

Next to the stadium stand the office buildings, which was once the home of the Hungarian Ice Hockey Federation, the Hungarian Bandy Federation and the Hungarian Field Hockey Federation.

In 1988 new floodlights were erected, thus making the arena available for TV coverage and there were also set up seven TV- and radio reporter rooms and journalist boxes.

One of the biggest shortcomings of the stadium is that it is not covered, therefore its season is limited from October to March and is also more exposed to weather effects. During the years, there have been many plans to solve this problem, but it failed again and again, mostly due to financial reasons. In addition, unlike other arenas, the Kisstadion has a particularly wide span (90 metres), which makes to find the statically appropriate solution more complicated and more expensive.

In 2009 the arena was planned to be demolished and replaced by a brand new ice rink, however, the Hungarian Ice Hockey Federation could not realize this goal. In November 2010, Attila Czene, head of Ministry of Resources have announced that a complete reconstruction is imminent and the stadium will get finally a roof. Eventually, with some delays and modifications an insulated tent and a mobile ice rink was set up to lengthen the ice-season and make it more resistant against harsh weather conditions. The construction started in the second half of September and was completed in one and a half month.

== Selected events ==
- 1962 World Weightlifting Championships
- 1963 European Figure Skating Championships
- 1964 Women's European Basketball Championship
- Holiday on Ice show
- Harlem Globetrotters show
- Roger Waters
- Iron Maiden concert
- Sting concert
- Joan Baez concert
- Depeche Mode concert
- Kraftwerk concert
- Tankcsapda concert
- Deep Purple concert
- Kiss concert
- Emerson, Lake and Palmer concert
- Black Sabbath concert
- Joe Cocker concert
- Hungarian Ice Hockey Winter Classics
- Omega concert September 5, 1980.
- Red Hot Chili Peppers concert
- The Cure concert 1989
