= Natascha Ragosina =

Russian boxer and kickboxer (born 1976)

Natalya Ragozina Наталья Юрьевна Рагозина
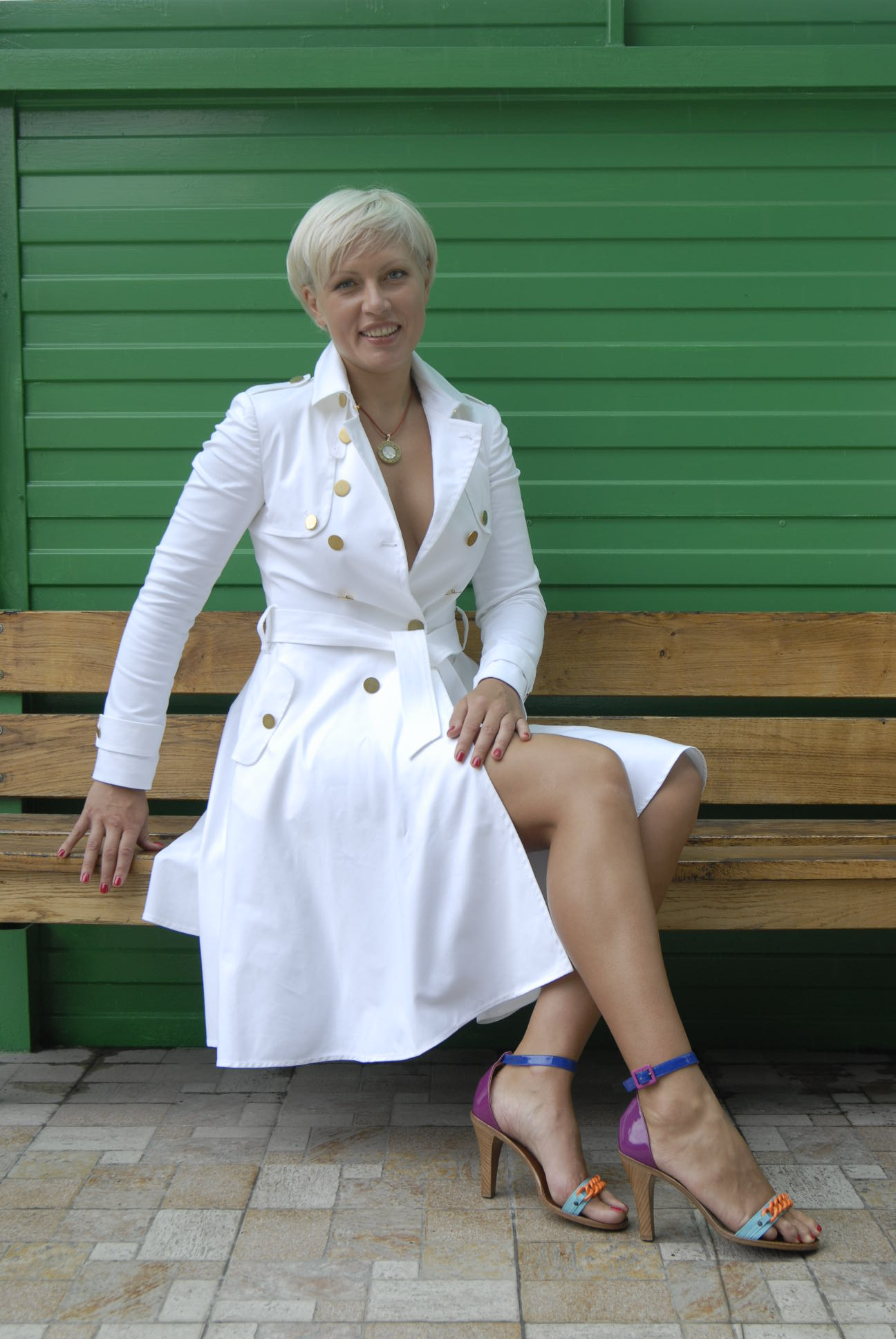

Personal information
- Nicknames: The Russian Tsarina; Miss Sledgehammer
- Nationality: Russian
- Born: Natalia Yurievna Ragozina; 5 April 1976 (age 50) Karaganda, Kazakh SSR, USSR (nowadays Kazakhstan)
- Height: 5 ft 11 1/2 in (182 cm)
- Weight: Super middleweight; Heavyweight

Boxing career
- Stance: Orthodox

Boxing record
- Total fights: 22
- Wins: 22
- Win by KO: 13

Natalia Yurievna Ragozina (Russian: Наталья Юрьевна Рагозина; born 5 April 1976), better known as Natascha Ragosina, is an undefeated retired Russian professional boxer who spent much of her career ranked as the top female super middleweight in the world.

== Career ==
Born in Kazakhstan (formerly a part of the Soviet Union) and currently residing in Moscow, she is the longest reigning WBA female super middleweight champion and WBC female super middleweight champion. At the time of her retirement, she held all major female super middleweight titles and two heavyweight belts:

- IWBF (International Women's Boxing Federation) super middleweight title
- WIBF (Women's International Boxing Federation) super middleweight title
- WIBA (Women's International Boxing Association) super middleweight title
- Global Boxing Union Female super middleweight title
- WBC female super middleweight title
- WBA female super middleweight title
- WIBC super middleweight title
- WIBF (Women's International Boxing Federation) heavyweight title
- WBF (Women's Boxing Federation) heavyweight title

On 15 March 2008, Ragosina defeated Bermudian Teresa Perozzi to win a record seven championship belts in a single fight. This broke Giselle Salandy's previous record of six belts won in a single fight. However, two weeks later, Salandy – a light middleweight boxer – defeated Karolina Lukasik in a match with eight titles on the line to regain her record for titles won in a single fight.

On 11 July 2008, Ragosina won a controversial decision against Conjestina Achieng, winning a close but unanimous decision. One judge awarded Ragosina the fight by a single round, and the other two judges had Ragosina winning by a two-round margin. Some boxing observers believe Achieng won the fight. The two had a rematch on 28 November 2008, which Ragosina also won.

On 19 December 2009, Ragosina defeated heavyweight world champion Pamela London by knockout to add two heavyweight championships to her resume – the WIBF Women's International Boxing Federation heavyweight title and the World Boxing Federation heavyweight title. Despite a 65-pound (29 kg) weight disadvantage (Ragosina weighed in at 172 lb (78 kg), compared to London's 237 lb (108 kg)), the 5 ft 11 1/2 in (181 cm) Ragosina used her reach and quickness to knock out London in round 8. This brought Ragosina's record to 22-0, including a 16-0 record in title fights.

Ragosina was inducted into the International Women's Boxing Hall of Fame in 2021.

== Titles ==
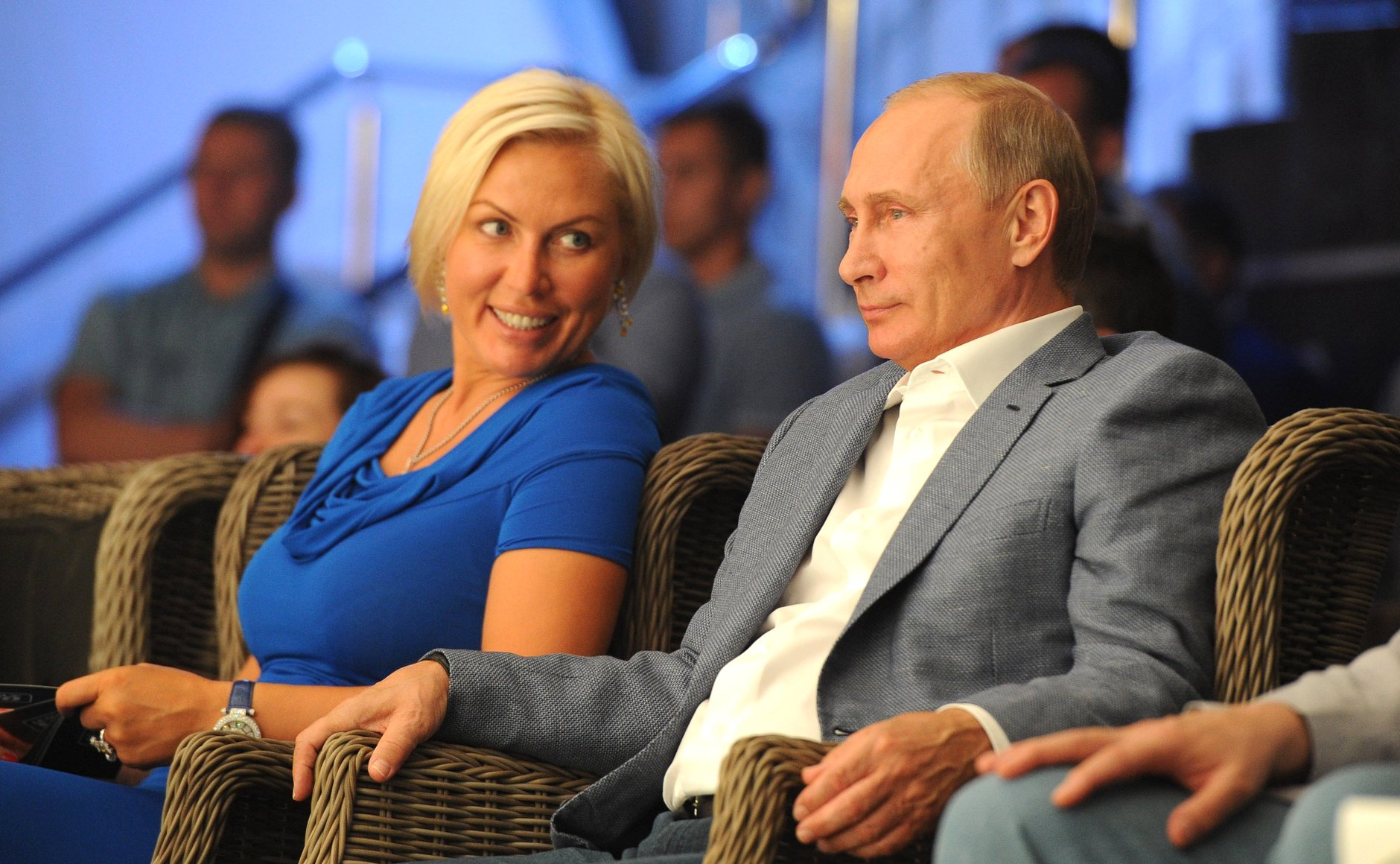
Ragosina with Putin, 2015

Boxing

- 2009 WBF heavyweight world champion
- 2009 W.I.B.F. heavyweight world champion
- 2008 I.W.B.F. super middleweight world champion
- 2007–09 W.B.C. super middleweight world champion (4 title defences)
- 2007–08 W.I.B.A. super middleweight world champion (2 title defences)
- 2007–09 W.B.A. super middleweight world champion (6 title defences)
- 2006–09 Global Boxing Union (GBU). super middleweight world champion (7 title defences)
- 2005–09 W.I.B.F. super middleweight world champion (10 title defences)
- 2004–05 W.I.B.F. super middleweight Inter-Continental champion (1 title defence)

Kickboxing

- 1999 W.A.K.O. World Championships in Caorle, Italy (gold) +70 kg (Full-Contact)
- 1998 W.A.K.O. European Championships in Leverkusen, Germany (gold) +65 kg (Full-Contact)
- 1996 W.A.K.O. European Championships in Belgrade, Serbia & Montenegro (gold) +65 kg (Full-Contact)

== Professional boxing record ==
22 fights	22 wins	0 losses
By knockout	13	0
By decision	9	0

No.	Result	Record	Opponent	Type	Round, time	Date	Location	Notes
22	Win	22–0	Pamela London	KO	8 (10), 2:36	19 December 2009	DIVS Arena, Yekaterinburg, Russia	Won WIBF and WBF Heavyweight titles.
21	Win	21–0	Laura Ramsey	UD	10	3 July 2009	Soccio Center, Langenhagen, Germany	Retained WBA and WBC Super middleweight titles.
20	Win	20–0	Iva Weston	TKO	6 (10), 1:19	28 March 2009	Mehrzweckhalle Grossziethen, Schönefeld, Germany	Retained GBU, WIBF and WBC Super middleweight titles.
19	Win	19–0	Conjestina Achieng	UD	10	28 November 2008	Maritim Hotel, Magdeburg, Germany	Retained WBA and WBC Super middleweight titles.
18	Win	18–0	Conjestina Achieng	UD	10	11 July 2008	Rundturnhalle, Cuxhaven, Germany	Retained GBU and WIBF Super middleweight titles.
17	Win	17–0	Teresa Perozzi	UD	10	15 March 2008	Maritim Hotel, Magdeburg, Germany	Won vacant IWBF and vacant WIBC Super middleweight titles. Retained GBU, WIBA, WIBF, WBA and WBC Super middleweight titles.
16	Win	16–0	Akondaye Fountain	UD	10	15 December 2007	Anhalt Arena, Dessau, Germany	Won vacant WBC Super middleweight title. Retained GBU, WIBA, WIBF and WBA Super middleweight titles.
15	Win	15–0	Gardy Pena Álvarez	TKO	2 (10), 1:41	8 September 2007	Maritim Hotel, Tiergarten, Berlin, Germany	Won vacant WIBA Super middleweight title. Retained GBU, WIBF and WBA Super middleweight titles.
14	Win	14–0	Dakota Stone	UD	10	25 May 2007	Fight Night Arena, Cologne, Germany	Retained GBU, WIBF and WBA Super middleweight titles.
13	Win	13–0	Yahaira Hernandez	TKO	7 (10), 1:08	17 February 2007	Maritim Hotel, Magdeburg, Germany	Won vacant WBA Super middleweight title. Retained GBU and WIBF Super middleweight titles.
12	Win	12–0	Scroller Carrington	TKO	3 (10), 1:00	18 November 2006	Burg-Waechter Castello, Düsseldorf, Germany	Retained WIBF Super middleweight title.
11	Win	11–0	Carlette Ewell	TKO	5 (10), 1:23	15 April 2006	Maritim Hotel, Magdeburg, Germany	Won vacant GBU Super middleweight title. Retained WIBF Super middleweight title.
10	Win	10–0	Dakota Stone	UD	10	14 January 2006	Ballhaus Arena, Aschersleben, Germany	Retained WIBF Super middleweight title.
9	Win	9–0	Monica Mwakasanga	KO	2 (10), 1:52	29 October 2005	TURM Erlebnis City, Oranienburg, Germany	Won vacant WIBF Super middleweight title.
8	Win	8–0	Maria Velichkova	TKO	1 (6), 1:21	17 September 2005	Harzlandhalle, Ilsenburg, Germany	
7	Win	7–0	Valerie Mahfood	UD	10	9 July 2005	Life Sportpark Herrenkrug, Magdeburg, Germany	Retained WIBF Inter-Continental Super middleweight title.
6	Win	6–0	Šárka Stoklásková	TKO	2 (6), 1:49	7 May 2005	Volkswagen Halle, Braunschweig, Germany	
5	Win	5–0	Borislava Goranova	UD	4	15 January 2005	Bördelandhalle, Magdeburg, Germany	
4	Win	4–0	Yvonne Reis	TKO	10 (10), 1:14	11 December 2004	Lausitz Arena, Cottbus, Germany	Won vacant WIBF Inter-Continental Super middleweight title.
3	Win	3–0	Alexandra Vajdova	TKO	3 (4), 1:23	16 October 2004	Neue Messehalle, Halle an der Saale, Germany	
2	Win	2–0	Dana Tabuskova	TKO	2 (4)	18 September 2004	Hermann Gieseler Halle, Magdeburg, Germany	
1	Win	1–0	Olga Gorbonosenko	KO	1 (4)	17 July 2004	Anhalt Arena, Dessau, Germany	Professional debut.

== See also ==
- List of female boxers
- List of female kickboxers
- List of undefeated world boxing champions

Sporting positions
Major world boxing titles
Inaugural champion	WBA female super middleweight champion 17 February 2007 – 2009; Retired	Vacant Title next held by Alicia Napoleon
Vacant Title last held by Laila Ali	WBC female super middleweight champion 15 December 2007 – 2009; Retired	Vacant Title next held by Nikki Adler
Inaugural champion	Undisputed female super middleweight champion 15 December 2007 – 2009; Retired	Vacant Title next held by Franchón Crews-Dezurn
