= Conjestina Achieng =

Kenyan boxer (born 1977)

Personal information
- Nickname: Hands of Stone
- Nationality: Kenya
- Born: Conjestina Achieng; 20 October 1977 (age 48) Umiru village, Yala division, Siaya District, Kenya
- Weight: Middleweight

Boxing career
- Stance: Orthodox

Boxing record
- Total fights: 27
- Wins: 17
- Win by KO: 8
- Losses: 6
- Draws: 4
- No contests: 0

Conjestina Achieng (born 20 October 1977) is a Kenyan retired female boxer who has been nicknamed "Hands of Stone". She became the first African woman to hold an international title when she beat Ugandan Fiona Tugume to take the vacant WIBF Middleweight title. She also twice lost out in controversial title fight circumstances to then WBC and WBA Super middleweight Natascha Ragosina.

== Personal life ==
Achieng was born in Umiru village, Yala division, Siaya District. Conjestina is the fifth born in a family of ten. Her father, Clement Adalo, is a retired medical officer.

== Health issues ==
In January 2011, Conjestina's father sent an appeal to Kenyans to help him take her to hospital after her behaviour deteriorated from the norm. According to her father, Conjestina had removed her son from school, set ablaze to all her boxing gear and disposed of all the equipment from her gymnasium, which she had opened in 2009. She was admitted at the Mathari hospital in Nairobi which specialises in mental health care. She was later released.

On 4 September 2012, a story ran on Citizen TV showing Conjestina in a state of confusion and utter despair. The former boxer showed off her belts. She was said to be living in poverty having not paid her Ksh 2000 ($23) rent for 4 months. She was under the care of her younger sister. Conjestina was later taken to the Mathari Hospital by Ida Odinga. A popular campaign on social media raised enough money for her to move into a more comfortable dwelling. The comedian Daniel Ndambuki (Churchill) personally donated 180,000 s to pay her rent after public pressure reminded him of a promise he had made to support her.

== Professional boxing record ==
27 fights	17 wins	6 losses
By knockout	8	1
By decision	9	5
Draws	4	

No.	Result	Record	Opponent	Type	Round, time	Date	Location	Notes
27	Win	17-6-4	(Russia) Angel McKenzie	UD	10, 2:00	27 Feb 2010	Charter Hall, Nairobi, Kenya	
26	Win	16-6-4	(Kenya) Batroba Lihavi	TKO	4	29 Aug 2009	Chui Restaurant, Nairobi, Kenya	
25	Draw	15-6-4	(Sweden) Maria Lindberg	PTS	10, 2:00	8 May 2009	Royal Event Center, Spandau, Sweden	
24	Win	15-6-3	(Kenya) Charity Mukami	UD	6, 3:00	28 Feb 2009	Hotel Casuarina, Buru Buru, Nairobi, Kenya	
23	Loss	14-6-3	(Russia) Natascha Ragosina	UD	10, 2:00	28 Nov 2008	Maritim Hotel, Magdeburg, Germany	WBA and WBC Super middleweight titles.
22	Loss	14-5-3	(Russia) Natascha Ragosina	UD	10, 2:00	11 Jul 2008	Germany Rundturnhalle, Cuxhaven, Germany	GBU and WIBF Super middleweight titles.
21	Win	14-4-3	(Kenya) Batroba Lihavi	TKO	3, 1:58	13 Apr 2008	Club Afrique, Nairobi, Kenya	
20	Win	13-4-3	(Kenya) Charity Mukami	MD	6, 2:00	8 Dec 2007	Charter Hall, Nairobi, Kenya	
19	Win	12-4-3	(Zimbabwe) Emily Kabwalo	PTS	6, 2:00	14 Jul 2007	Moi International Sport Centre, Kasarani, Kenya	
18	Win	11-4-3	(Kenya) Jalala Salum	KO	2	12 May 2007	Charter Hall, Nairobi, Kenya	
17	Win	10-4-3	(Tanzania) Monica Mwakasanga	TKO	5	10 Mar 2007	Nyayo National Stadium, Nairobi, Kenya	
16	Loss	9-4-3	(United States) Laura Ramsey	TKO	6	20 Jan 2007	Travellers Beach Hotel & Club, Mombasa, Kenya	GBU Female World Middleweight title
15	Loss	9-3-3	(United States) Janaya Davis	PTS	6, 2:00	2 Dec 2006	Moi International Sport Centre, Nairobi, Kenya	
14	Win	9-2-3	(Uganda) Florence Nalukwago	UD	6, 2:00	5 Aug 2006	Nyayo National Stadium, Nairobi, Kenya	
13	Loss	8-2-3	(United States) Yvonne Reis	SD	10, 2:00	1 Apr 2006	Moi International Sport Centre, Nairobi, Kenya	WBC World Female Middleweight title
12	Win	8-1-3	(Zimbabwe) Monalisa Sibanda	UD	6, 2:00	4 Feb 2006	Nyayo National Stadium, Nairobi, Kenya	
11	Win	7-1-3	(Argentina) Guillermina Fernandez	TKO	1, 1:42	24 Dec 2005	Kenyatta International Conference Centre, Nairobi, Kenya	WBF Women's Middleweight title
10	Win	6-1-3	(Tanzania) Monica Mwakasanga	TKO	9	21 Aug 2005	Moi International Sport Centre, Nairobi, Kenya	WIBF World Middleweight title
9	Win	5-1-3	(Tanzania) Monica Mwakasanga	KO	5	25 Mar 2005	Nyayo National Stadium, Nairobi, Kenya	
8	Win	4-1-3	(Uganda) Fiona Tugume	UD	10, 2:00	19 Dec 2004	Nyayo National Stadium, Nairobi, Kenya	GBU Female Middleweight title
7	Loss	3-1-3	(Tanzania) Monica Mwakasanga	UD	6, 2:00	15 Nov 2004	Tripple A Hotel, Arusha, Tanzania	
6	Win	3-0-3	(Uganda) Fiona Tugume	KO	7	23 Oct 2004	Nyayo National Stadium, Nairobi, Kenya	Africa Women's Middleweight Title
5	Draw	2-0-3	(Kenya) Jane Kavulani	PTS	4, 2:00	28 Aug 2004	Jam Rescue 2 Club, Nairobi, Kenya	
4	Draw	2-0-2	(Kenya) Fatuma Zarika	PTS	4, 2:00	13 Dec 2003	Nyayo National Stadium, Nairobi, Kenya	
3	Win	2-0-1	(Kenya) Jane Kavulani	PTS	4, 2:00	15 May 2003	Nairobi, Kenya	
2	Draw	1-0-1	(Kenya) Damaris Muthoni	PTS	4, 2:00	Sept 9, 2002	Nairobi, Kenya	
1	Win	1-0-0	(Kenya) Naomi Wanjiku	PTS	4, 2:00	8 Jun 2002	Nairobi, Kenya	

== See also ==
- List of female boxers
- Luo people of Kenya and Tanzania
