= Tomaž Barada =

Slovenian martial artist in kickboxing and taekwon-do practitioner

Tomaž Barada is a former Slovenian martial artist in kickboxing and taekwon-do (7th Dan). He gained several titles during his career.

He became 6x ITF European Champion, 3x ITF World Champion and 3x King of Taekwon-Do Tokyo.

He also became 5x W.A.K.O. European and 5x WAKO World Champion. Currently retired, he is holding the WAKO record of 84 fights without a loss. He retired in 2004 after defending his WAKO pro title for the final time.

He is the current Vice president of the Slovenian Olympic Committee.
