= 2020 Vuelta a Guatemala =

2020 UCI America Tour

Race details
- Dates: 23 October – 1 November 2020
- Stages: 10
- Distance: 1,203.5 km (747.8 mi)
- Winning time: 31h 40' 44"

Results
| Jersey awarded to the overall winner | Winner | Mardoqueo Vásquez (GUA) | (Hino-One-La Red-Tigo-Eurobikes) |
| | Second | Santiago Ordoñez (COL) | (Canel's–Zerouno) |
| | Third | Byron Guamá (ECU) | (Best PC Ecuador) |
| Jersey awarded to the points classification winner | Points | Byron Guamá (ECU) | (Best PC Ecuador) |
| Jersey awarded to the mountains classification winner | Mountains | Byron Guamá (ECU) | (Best PC Ecuador) |
| Jersey awarded to the youth classification winner | Youth | Alex Julajuj (GUA) | (Ópticas Deluxe-Ninosport) |
| Jersey awarded to the sprints classification winner | Sprints | Cristian Pita (ECU) | (Best PC Ecuador) |
| | Team | Hino-One-La Red-Tigo-Eurobikes | |

The 2020 Vuelta a Guatemala was a road cycling stage race that took place in Guatemala between 23 October and 1 November 2020. The race was rated as a 2.2 event as part of the 2020 UCI America Tour, and was the 60th edition of the Vuelta a Guatemala.

== Teams ==
Two UCI Continental teams, one national team, and eleven domestic teams make up the fourteen teams that participated in the race. Only three of those teams did not enter the maximum of six riders; ASO Quetzaltenalgo-C.Castelli, Canel's–Zerouno, and Decorabaños each entered five. This meant that 81 riders started the race, of which 61 finished.

UCI Continental Teams

- Best PC Ecuador
- Canel's–Zerouno

National Teams

- Panama

Domestic Teams

- (Guatemala) A.C. Chimaltenango-Comayma-Linaflor
- (Guatemala) ASO Quetzaltenalgo-C.Castelli
- (Guatemala) ASO Quiche-India Quiche
- (Guatemala) ASO San Marcos-Acredicom
- (Guatemala) ASO Solola-Intercop
- (Guatemala) Decorabaños
- (Mexico) Dicafriem
- Ejercito de Guatemala
- (Guatemala) Hino-One-La Red-Tigo-Eurobikes
- (Guatemala) Ópticas Deluxe-Ninosport
- Team France Défense

== Route ==
Stage characteristics and winners
| Stage | Date | Course | Distance | Type | Stage winner |
|---|---|---|---|---|---|
| 1 | October 23 | Chiquimula to Guastatoya | 148 km (92 mi) | Hilly stage | Julio Padilla (GUA) |
| 2 | October 24 | Jalapa to Barbarena | 147.5 km (91.7 mi) | Hilly stage | Roberto González (PAN) |
| 3 | October 25 | Guatemala City to Coatepeque | 218 km (135 mi) | Hilly stage | Roberto González (PAN) |
| 4 | October 26 | Champerico to Retalhuleu | 43 km (27 mi) | Individual time trial | Christofer Jurado (PAN) |
| 5 | October 27 | Suchitepéquez to Cerro El Baúl | 106 km (66 mi) | Mountain stage | Mardoqueo Vásquez (GUA) |
| 6 | October 28 | Totonicapán to Esquipulas Palo Gordo | 106 km (66 mi) | Hilly stage | Harold López (ECU) |
| 7 | October 29 | Tejutla to Santa Catarina Ixtahuacan | 101 km (63 mi) | Hilly stage | Mardoqueo Vásquez (GUA) |
| 8 | October 30 | San Pablo La Laguna to Iximche Ruins | 90 km (56 mi) | Hilly stage | Harold López (ECU) |
| 9 | October 31 | Santa Apolonia to Aldea Chuchucá Alto | 139 km (86 mi) | Mountain stage | Manuel Rodas (GUA) |
| 10 | November 1 | Guatemala City to Guatemala City | 105 km (65 mi) | Hilly stage | Christofer Jurado (PAN) |
| Total | | 1,203.5 km (747.8 mi) | | | |

== Stages ==
=== Stage 1 ===
23 October 2020 — Chiquimula to Guastatoya, 148 km (92 mi)

Stage 1 Result
| Rank | Rider | Team | Time |
|---|---|---|---|
| 1 | Julio Padilla (GUA) | Ópticas Deluxe-Ninosport | 3h 38' 33" |
| 2 | Edgar Torres (GUA) | Hino-One-La Red-Tigo-Eurobikes | + 9" |
| 3 | Christofer Jurado (PAN) | Panama | + 10" |
| 4 | Byron Guamá (ECU) | Best PC Ecuador | + 10" |
| 5 | Roberto González (PAN) | Panama | + 10" |
| 6 | Alex Julajuj (GUA) | Ópticas Deluxe-Ninosport | + 10" |
| 7 | José David Canastuj (GUA) | Ópticas Deluxe-Ninosport | + 10" |
| 8 | Dorian Monterroso (GUA) | ASO San Marcos-Acredicom | + 10" |
| 9 | Alfredo Ajpacajá (GUA) | Decorabaños | + 10" |
| 10 | Harold López (ECU) | Best PC Ecuador | + 10" |

General classification after Stage 1
| Rank | Rider | Team | Time |
|---|---|---|---|
| 1 | Julio Padilla (GUA) | Ópticas Deluxe-Ninosport | 3h 38' 33" |
| 2 | Edgar Torres (GUA) | Hino-One-La Red-Tigo-Eurobikes | + 9" |
| 3 | Christofer Jurado (PAN) | Panama | + 10" |
| 4 | Byron Guamá (ECU) | Best PC Ecuador | + 10" |
| 5 | Roberto González (PAN) | Panama | + 10" |
| 6 | Alex Julajuj (GUA) | Ópticas Deluxe-Ninosport | + 10" |
| 7 | José David Canastuj (GUA) | Ópticas Deluxe-Ninosport | + 10" |
| 8 | Dorian Monterroso (GUA) | ASO San Marcos-Acredicom | + 10" |
| 9 | Alfredo Ajpacajá (GUA) | Decorabaños | + 10" |
| 10 | Harold López (ECU) | Best PC Ecuador | + 10" |

=== Stage 2 ===
24 October 2020 — Jalapa to Barbarena, 147.5 km (91.7 mi)

Stage 2 Result
| Rank | Rider | Team | Time |
|---|---|---|---|
| 1 | Roberto González (PAN) | Panama | 4h 03' 28" |
| 2 | Leonardo González (GUA) | A.C. Chimaltenango-Comayma-Linaflor | + 4" |
| 3 | Bolívar Espinoza (PAN) | Panama | + 40" |
| 4 | Santiago Ordoñez (COL) | Canel's–Zerouno | + 40" |
| 5 | Edgar Torres (GUA) | Hino-One-La Red-Tigo-Eurobikes | + 40" |
| 6 | Byron Guamá (ECU) | Best PC Ecuador | + 40" |
| 7 | Christofer Jurado (PAN) | Panama | + 40" |
| 8 | Alex Julajuj (GUA) | Ópticas Deluxe-Ninosport | + 48" |
| 9 | Jhonnatan De León (GUA) | Hino-One-La Red-Tigo-Eurobikes | + 50" |
| 10 | Sergio Chumil (GUA) | Ejercito de Guatemala | + 50" |

General classification after Stage 2
| Rank | Rider | Team | Time |
|---|---|---|---|
| 1 | Roberto González (PAN) | Panama | 7h 42' 11" |
| 2 | Leonardo González (GUA) | A.C. Chimaltenango-Comayma-Linaflor | + 4" |
| 3 | Edgar Torres (GUA) | Hino-One-La Red-Tigo-Eurobikes | + 39" |
| 4 | Byron Guamá (ECU) | Best PC Ecuador | + 40" |
| 5 | Christofer Jurado (PAN) | Panama | + 40" |
| 6 | Santiago Ordoñez (COL) | Canel's–Zerouno | + 40" |
| 7 | Bolívar Espinoza (PAN) | Panama | + 40" |
| 8 | Alex Julajuj (GUA) | Ópticas Deluxe-Ninosport | + 48" |
| 9 | Jhonnatan De León (GUA) | Hino-One-La Red-Tigo-Eurobikes | + 50" |
| 10 | Mardoqueo Vásquez (GUA) | Hino-One-La Red-Tigo-Eurobikes | + 50" |

=== Stage 3 ===
25 October 2020 — Guatemala City to Coatepeque, 218 km (135 mi)

Stage 3 Result
| Rank | Rider | Team | Time |
|---|---|---|---|
| 1 | Roberto González (PAN) | Panama | 5h 09' 16" |
| 2 | Alfredo Ajpacajá (GUA) | Decorabaños | + 0" |
| 3 | Sergio Chumil (GUA) | Ejercito de Guatemala | + 0" |
| 4 | Christofer Jurado (PAN) | Panama | + 0" |
| 5 | Cesar Ixehuati (MEX) | Dicafriem | + 0" |
| 6 | Alex Julajuj (GUA) | Ópticas Deluxe-Ninosport | + 0" |
| 7 | Leonardo González (GUA) | A.C. Chimaltenango-Comayma-Linaflor | + 0" |
| 8 | Sebastián Rodas (COL) | Dicafriem | + 0" |
| 9 | Jhonnatan De León (GUA) | Hino-One-La Red-Tigo-Eurobikes | + 0" |
| 10 | Byron Guamá (ECU) | Best PC Ecuador | + 0" |

General classification after Stage 3
| Rank | Rider | Team | Time |
|---|---|---|---|
| 1 | Roberto González (PAN) | Panama | 12h 51' 27" |
| 2 | Leonardo González (GUA) | A.C. Chimaltenango-Comayma-Linaflor | + 4" |
| 3 | Edgar Torres (GUA) | Hino-One-La Red-Tigo-Eurobikes | + 39" |
| 4 | Christofer Jurado (PAN) | Panama | + 40" |
| 5 | Byron Guamá (ECU) | Best PC Ecuador | + 40" |
| 6 | Santiago Ordoñez (COL) | Canel's–Zerouno | + 40" |
| 7 | Alex Julajuj (GUA) | Ópticas Deluxe-Ninosport | + 48" |
| 8 | Sergio Chumil (GUA) | Ejercito de Guatemala | + 50" |
| 9 | Jhonnatan De León (GUA) | Hino-One-La Red-Tigo-Eurobikes | + 50" |
| 10 | Mardoqueo Vásquez (GUA) | Hino-One-La Red-Tigo-Eurobikes | + 50" |

=== Stage 4 ===
26 October 2020 — Champerico to Retalhuleu, 43 km (27 mi) (ITT)

Stage 4 Result
| Rank | Rider | Team | Time |
|---|---|---|---|
| 1 | Christofer Jurado (PAN) | Panama | 59' 05" |
| 2 | Santiago Ordoñez (COL) | Canel's–Zerouno | + 1' 00" |
| 3 | Manuel Rodas (GUA) | Decorabaños | + 1' 11" |
| 4 | Franklin Archibold (PAN) | Panama | + 2' 18" |
| 5 | Alfredo Ajpacajá (GUA) | Decorabaños | + 2' 25" |
| 6 | Mardoqueo Vásquez (GUA) | Hino-One-La Red-Tigo-Eurobikes | + 2' 28" |
| 7 | Edgar Torres (GUA) | Hino-One-La Red-Tigo-Eurobikes | + 2' 28" |
| 8 | Gerson Toc (GUA) | Hino-One-La Red-Tigo-Eurobikes | + 2' 54" |
| 9 | Brayan Ríos (GUA) | ASO Quiche-India Quiche | + 2' 56" |
| 10 | Jhonnatan De León (GUA) | Hino-One-La Red-Tigo-Eurobikes | + 2' 56" |

General classification after Stage 4
| Rank | Rider | Team | Time |
|---|---|---|---|
| 1 | Christofer Jurado (PAN) | Panama | 13h 51' 12" |
| 2 | Santiago Ordoñez (COL) | Canel's–Zerouno | + 1' 00" |
| 3 | Edgar Torres (GUA) | Hino-One-La Red-Tigo-Eurobikes | + 2' 27" |
| 4 | Mardoqueo Vásquez (GUA) | Hino-One-La Red-Tigo-Eurobikes | + 2' 38" |
| 5 | Jhonnatan De León (GUA) | Hino-One-La Red-Tigo-Eurobikes | + 3' 06" |
| 6 | Alex Julajuj (GUA) | Ópticas Deluxe-Ninosport | + 3' 08" |
| 7 | Manuel Rodas (GUA) | Decorabaños | + 3' 12" |
| 8 | Roberto González (PAN) | Panama | + 3' 57" |
| 9 | Alfredo Ajpacajá (GUA) | Decorabaños | + 4' 18" |
| 10 | Leonardo González (GUA) | A.C. Chimaltenango-Comayma-Linaflor | + 4' 58" |

=== Stage 5 ===
27 October 2020 — Suchitepéquez to Cerro El Baúl, 106 km (66 mi)

Stage 5 Result
| Rank | Rider | Team | Time |
|---|---|---|---|
| 1 | Mardoqueo Vásquez (GUA) | Hino-One-La Red-Tigo-Eurobikes | 3h 29' 59" |
| 2 | Francisco Osweli González (GUA) | Decorabaños | + 3' 05" |
| 3 | Byron Guamá (ECU) | Best PC Ecuador | + 3' 06" |
| 4 | Julian Yac (GUA) | Decorabaños | + 3' 45" |
| 5 | Harold López (ECU) | Best PC Ecuador | + 5' 30" |
| 6 | Santiago Ordoñez (COL) | Canel's–Zerouno | + 5' 46" |
| 7 | Leonardo González (GUA) | A.C. Chimaltenango-Comayma-Linaflor | + 5' 51" |
| 8 | Edgar Torres (GUA) | Hino-One-La Red-Tigo-Eurobikes | + 6' 10" |
| 9 | Esdras Morales (GUA) | Hino-One-La Red-Tigo-Eurobikes | + 6' 12" |
| 10 | Sergio Chumil (GUA) | Ejercito de Guatemala | + 6' 12" |

General classification after Stage 5
| Rank | Rider | Team | Time |
|---|---|---|---|
| 1 | Mardoqueo Vásquez (GUA) | Hino-One-La Red-Tigo-Eurobikes | 17h 23' 49" |
| 2 | Santiago Ordoñez (COL) | Canel's–Zerouno | + 4' 08" |
| 3 | Edgar Torres (GUA) | Hino-One-La Red-Tigo-Eurobikes | + 5' 59" |
| 4 | Byron Guamá (ECU) | Best PC Ecuador | + 6' 46" |
| 5 | Christofer Jurado (PAN) | Panama | + 7' 35" |
| 6 | Leonardo González (GUA) | A.C. Chimaltenango-Comayma-Linaflor | + 8' 09" |
| 7 | Jhonnatan De León (GUA) | Hino-One-La Red-Tigo-Eurobikes | + 8' 10" |
| 8 | Cristian Camilo Cubides (COL) | Hino-One-La Red-Tigo-Eurobikes | + 9' 54" |
| 9 | Gerson Toc (GUA) | Hino-One-La Red-Tigo-Eurobikes | + 10' 07" |
| 10 | Alfredo Ajpacajá (GUA) | Decorabaños | + 10' 46" |

=== Stage 6 ===
28 October 2020 — Totonicapán to Esquipulas Palo Gordo, 106 km (66 mi)

Stage 6 Result
| Rank | Rider | Team | Time |
|---|---|---|---|
| 1 | Harold López (ECU) | Best PC Ecuador | 2h 36' 13" |
| 2 | Byron Guamá (ECU) | Best PC Ecuador | + 44" |
| 3 | Francisco Osweli González (GUA) | Decorabaños | + 44" |
| 4 | Santiago Ordoñez (COL) | Canel's–Zerouno | + 44" |
| 5 | Mardoqueo Vásquez (GUA) | Hino-One-La Red-Tigo-Eurobikes | + 44" |
| 6 | Fredy Toc (GUA) | A.C. Chimaltenango-Comayma-Linaflor | + 1' 08" |
| 7 | Alex Julajuj (GUA) | Ópticas Deluxe-Ninosport | + 1' 17" |
| 8 | Esdras Morales (GUA) | Hino-One-La Red-Tigo-Eurobikes | + 2' 33" |
| 9 | Pascal Bousquet (FRA) | Team France Défense | + 2' 34" |
| 10 | Leonardo González (GUA) | A.C. Chimaltenango-Comayma-Linaflor | + 2' 34" |

General classification after Stage 6
| Rank | Rider | Team | Time |
|---|---|---|---|
| 1 | Mardoqueo Vásquez (GUA) | Hino-One-La Red-Tigo-Eurobikes | 20h 00' 46" |
| 2 | Santiago Ordoñez (COL) | Canel's–Zerouno | + 4' 08" |
| 3 | Byron Guamá (ECU) | Best PC Ecuador | + 6' 46" |
| 4 | Edgar Torres (GUA) | Hino-One-La Red-Tigo-Eurobikes | + 9' 43" |
| 5 | Leonardo González (GUA) | A.C. Chimaltenango-Comayma-Linaflor | + 9' 59" |
| 6 | Jhonnatan De León (GUA) | Hino-One-La Red-Tigo-Eurobikes | + 10' 00" |
| 7 | Gerson Toc (GUA) | Hino-One-La Red-Tigo-Eurobikes | + 11' 57" |
| 8 | Alex Julajuj (GUA) | Ópticas Deluxe-Ninosport | + 12' 49" |
| 9 | Cristian Camilo Cubides (COL) | Hino-One-La Red-Tigo-Eurobikes | + 13' 33" |
| 10 | Sergio Chumil (GUA) | Ejercito de Guatemala | + 13' 38" |

=== Stage 7 ===
29 October 2020 — Tejutla to Santa Catarina Ixtahuacan, 101 km (63 mi)

Stage 7 Result
| Rank | Rider | Team | Time |
|---|---|---|---|
| 1 | Mardoqueo Vásquez (GUA) | Hino-One-La Red-Tigo-Eurobikes | 2h 57' 58" |
| 2 | Francisco Osweli González (GUA) | Decorabaños | + 0" |
| 3 | Harold López (ECU) | Best PC Ecuador | + 1' 12" |
| 4 | Gerson Toc (GUA) | Hino-One-La Red-Tigo-Eurobikes | + 1' 14" |
| 5 | Sergio Chumil (GUA) | Ejercito de Guatemala | + 1' 14" |
| 6 | Santiago Ordoñez (COL) | Canel's–Zerouno | + 1' 14" |
| 7 | Fredy Toc (GUA) | A.C. Chimaltenango-Comayma-Linaflor | + 1' 14" |
| 8 | Celso Ajpacajá (GUA) | ASO San Marcos-Acredicom | + 1' 14" |
| 9 | Alex Julajuj (GUA) | Ópticas Deluxe-Ninosport | + 1' 14" |
| 10 | Leonardo González (GUA) | A.C. Chimaltenango-Comayma-Linaflor | + 1' 14" |

General classification after Stage 7
| Rank | Rider | Team | Time |
|---|---|---|---|
| 1 | Mardoqueo Vásquez (GUA) | Hino-One-La Red-Tigo-Eurobikes | 22h 58' 44" |
| 2 | Santiago Ordoñez (COL) | Canel's–Zerouno | + 5' 22" |
| 3 | Byron Guamá (ECU) | Best PC Ecuador | + 8' 00" |
| 4 | Leonardo González (GUA) | A.C. Chimaltenango-Comayma-Linaflor | + 11' 13" |
| 5 | Gerson Toc (GUA) | Hino-One-La Red-Tigo-Eurobikes | + 13' 11" |
| 6 | Alex Julajuj (GUA) | Ópticas Deluxe-Ninosport | + 14' 03" |
| 7 | Sergio Chumil (GUA) | Ejercito de Guatemala | + 14' 52" |
| 8 | Harold López (ECU) | Best PC Ecuador | + 17' 17" |
| 9 | Fredy Toc (GUA) | A.C. Chimaltenango-Comayma-Linaflor | + 20' 05" |
| 10 | Cristian Camilo Cubides (COL) | Hino-One-La Red-Tigo-Eurobikes | + 23' 56" |

=== Stage 8 ===
30 October 2020 — San Pablo La Laguna to Iximche Ruins, 90 km (56 mi)

Stage 8 Result
| Rank | Rider | Team | Time |
|---|---|---|---|
| 1 | Harold López (ECU) | Best PC Ecuador | 2h 43' 54" |
| 2 | Francisco Osweli González (GUA) | Decorabaños | + 0" |
| 3 | Celso Ajpacajá (GUA) | ASO San Marcos-Acredicom | + 10" |
| 4 | Gerson Toc (GUA) | Hino-One-La Red-Tigo-Eurobikes | + 37" |
| 5 | Melvin Boron (GUA) | Ejercito de Guatemala | + 1' 26" |
| 6 | Alex Julajuj (GUA) | Ópticas Deluxe-Ninosport | + 1' 30" |
| 7 | Sergio Chumil (GUA) | Ejercito de Guatemala | + 1' 30" |
| 8 | Leonardo González (GUA) | A.C. Chimaltenango-Comayma-Linaflor | + 1' 30" |
| 9 | Esdras Morales (GUA) | Hino-One-La Red-Tigo-Eurobikes | + 1' 30" |
| 10 | Byron Guamá (ECU) | Best PC Ecuador | + 1' 30" |

General classification after Stage 8
| Rank | Rider | Team | Time |
|---|---|---|---|
| 1 | Mardoqueo Vásquez (GUA) | Hino-One-La Red-Tigo-Eurobikes | 25h 44' 10" |
| 2 | Santiago Ordoñez (COL) | Canel's–Zerouno | + 5' 22" |
| 3 | Byron Guamá (ECU) | Best PC Ecuador | + 7' 58" |
| 4 | Leonardo González (GUA) | A.C. Chimaltenango-Comayma-Linaflor | + 11' 11" |
| 5 | Gerson Toc (GUA) | Hino-One-La Red-Tigo-Eurobikes | + 12' 16" |
| 6 | Alex Julajuj (GUA) | Ópticas Deluxe-Ninosport | + 14' 01" |
| 7 | Sergio Chumil (GUA) | Ejercito de Guatemala | + 14' 50" |
| 8 | Harold López (ECU) | Best PC Ecuador | + 15' 45" |
| 9 | Fredy Toc (GUA) | A.C. Chimaltenango-Comayma-Linaflor | + 20' 05" |
| 10 | Francisco Osweli González (GUA) | Decorabaños | + 22' 34" |

=== Stage 9 ===
31 October 2020 — Santa Apolonia to Aldea Chuchucá Alto, 139 km (86 mi)

Stage 9 Result
| Rank | Rider | Team | Time |
|---|---|---|---|
| 1 | Manuel Rodas (GUA) | Decorabaños | 3h 30' 25" |
| 2 | Pablo Caicedo (ECU) | Best PC Ecuador | + 23" |
| 3 | Byron Guamá (ECU) | Best PC Ecuador | + 2' 10" |
| 4 | Mardoqueo Vásquez (GUA) | Hino-One-La Red-Tigo-Eurobikes | + 2' 12" |
| 5 | Christofer Jurado (PAN) | Panama | + 2' 17" |
| 6 | Gerson Toc (GUA) | Hino-One-La Red-Tigo-Eurobikes | + 2' 21" |
| 7 | Santiago Ordoñez (COL) | Canel's–Zerouno | + 2' 21" |
| 8 | Leonardo González (GUA) | A.C. Chimaltenango-Comayma-Linaflor | + 2' 21" |
| 9 | Sergio Chumil (GUA) | Ejercito de Guatemala | + 2' 29" |
| 10 | Alex Julajuj (GUA) | Ópticas Deluxe-Ninosport | + 2' 29" |

General classification after Stage 9
| Rank | Rider | Team | Time |
|---|---|---|---|
| 1 | Mardoqueo Vásquez (GUA) | Hino-One-La Red-Tigo-Eurobikes | 29h 16' 47" |
| 2 | Santiago Ordoñez (COL) | Canel's–Zerouno | + 5' 31" |
| 3 | Byron Guamá (ECU) | Best PC Ecuador | + 7' 56" |
| 4 | Leonardo González (GUA) | A.C. Chimaltenango-Comayma-Linaflor | + 11' 20" |
| 5 | Gerson Toc (GUA) | Hino-One-La Red-Tigo-Eurobikes | + 12' 25" |
| 6 | Alex Julajuj (GUA) | Ópticas Deluxe-Ninosport | + 14' 18" |
| 7 | Sergio Chumil (GUA) | Ejercito de Guatemala | + 15' 07" |
| 8 | Harold López (ECU) | Best PC Ecuador | + 16' 36" |
| 9 | Fredy Toc (GUA) | A.C. Chimaltenango-Comayma-Linaflor | + 20' 22" |
| 10 | Francisco Osweli González (GUA) | Decorabaños | + 23' 37" |

=== Stage 10 ===
1 November 2020 — Guatemala City to Guatemala City, 105 km (65 mi)

Stage 10 Result
| Rank | Rider | Team | Time |
|---|---|---|---|
| 1 | Christofer Jurado (PAN) | Panama | 2h 23' 30" |
| 2 | Cristian Pita (ECU) | Best PC Ecuador | + 0" |
| 3 | Byron Guamá (ECU) | Best PC Ecuador | + 0" |
| 4 | Sebastián Rodas (COL) | Dicafriem | + 0" |
| 5 | Dorian Monterroso (GUA) | ASO San Marcos-Acredicom | + 0" |
| 6 | Luis Fernando López (HON) | Ópticas Deluxe-Ninosport | + 0" |
| 7 | Henry Sam (GUA) | Decorabaños | + 0" |
| 8 | Sergio Chumil (GUA) | Ejercito de Guatemala | + 0" |
| 9 | Pedro Pablo Morales (GUA) | Ejercito de Guatemala | + 0" |
| 10 | Alfredo Ajpacajá (GUA) | Decorabaños | + 0" |

General classification after Stage 10
| Rank | Rider | Team | Time |
|---|---|---|---|
| 1 | Mardoqueo Vásquez (GUA) | Hino-One-La Red-Tigo-Eurobikes | 31h 40' 44" |
| 2 | Santiago Ordoñez (COL) | Canel's–Zerouno | + 5' 04" |
| 3 | Byron Guamá (ECU) | Best PC Ecuador | + 7' 29" |
| 4 | Leonardo González (GUA) | A.C. Chimaltenango-Comayma-Linaflor | + 10' 53" |
| 5 | Gerson Toc (GUA) | Hino-One-La Red-Tigo-Eurobikes | + 12' 25" |
| 6 | Alex Julajuj (GUA) | Ópticas Deluxe-Ninosport | + 13' 51" |
| 7 | Sergio Chumil (GUA) | Ejercito de Guatemala | + 14' 40" |
| 8 | Harold López (ECU) | Best PC Ecuador | + 16' 25" |
| 9 | Fredy Toc (GUA) | A.C. Chimaltenango-Comayma-Linaflor | + 19' 55" |
| 10 | Francisco Osweli González (GUA) | Decorabaños | + 23' 10" |

== Classification leadership table ==
Classification leadership by stage
| Stage | Winner | General classification | Points classification | Mountains classification | Sprints classification | Young rider classification | Guatemalan rider classification | Team classification |
|---|---|---|---|---|---|---|---|---|
| 1 | Julio Padilla | Julio Padilla | Julio Padilla | Julio Padilla | Julio Padilla | Alex Julajuj | Julio Padilla | Ópticas Deluxe-Ninosport |
| 2 | Roberto González | Roberto González | Roberto González | Farfan Duran | Julio Padilla | Alex Julajuj | Leonardo González | Panama |
| 3 | Roberto González | Roberto González | Roberto González | Efrén Santos | Brayan Ríos | Alex Julajuj | Leonardo González | Hino-One-La Red-Tigo-Eurobikes |
| 4 | Christofer Jurado | Christofer Jurado | Roberto González | Efrén Santos | Brayan Ríos | Alex Julajuj | Edgar Torres | Hino-One-La Red-Tigo-Eurobikes |
| 5 | Mardoqueo Vásquez | Mardoqueo Vásquez | Roberto González | Mardoqueo Vásquez | Ignacio Prado | Sergio Chumil | Mardoqueo Vásquez | Hino-One-La Red-Tigo-Eurobikes |
| 6 | Harold López | Mardoqueo Vásquez | Byron Guamá | Mardoqueo Vásquez | Ignacio Prado | Alex Julajuj | Mardoqueo Vásquez | Hino-One-La Red-Tigo-Eurobikes |
| 7 | Mardoqueo Vásquez | Mardoqueo Vásquez | Mardoqueo Vásquez | Mardoqueo Vásquez | Ignacio Prado | Alex Julajuj | Mardoqueo Vásquez | Hino-One-La Red-Tigo-Eurobikes |
| 8 | Harold López | Mardoqueo Vásquez | Harold López | Mardoqueo Vásquez | Ignacio Prado | Alex Julajuj | Mardoqueo Vásquez | Hino-One-La Red-Tigo-Eurobikes |
| 9 | Manuel Rodas | Mardoqueo Vásquez | Mardoqueo Vásquez | Byron Guamá | Ignacio Prado | Alex Julajuj | Mardoqueo Vásquez | Hino-One-La Red-Tigo-Eurobikes |
| 10 | Christofer Jurado | Mardoqueo Vásquez | Byron Guamá | Byron Guamá | Cristian Pita | Alex Julajuj | Mardoqueo Vásquez | Hino-One-La Red-Tigo-Eurobikes |
| Final | | Mardoqueo Vásquez | Byron Guamá | Byron Guamá | Cristian Pita | Alex Julajuj | Mardoqueo Vásquez | Hino-One-La Red-Tigo-Eurobikes |

== Final classification standings ==
Legend
| Denotes the winner of the general classification | Denotes the winner of the sprints classification |
| Denotes the winner of the points classification | Denotes the winner of the young rider classification |
| Denotes the winner of the mountains classification | Denotes the winner of the Guatemalan rider classification |

=== General classification ===
Final general classification (1–10)
| Rank | Rider | Team | Time |
|---|---|---|---|
| 1 | Mardoqueo Vásquez (GUA) | Hino-One-La Red-Tigo-Eurobikes | 31h 40' 44" |
| 2 | Santiago Ordoñez (COL) | Canel's–Zerouno | + 5' 04" |
| 3 | Byron Guamá (ECU) | Best PC Ecuador | + 7' 29" |
| 4 | Leonardo González (GUA) | A.C. Chimaltenango-Comayma-Linaflor | + 10' 53" |
| 5 | Gerson Toc (GUA) | Hino-One-La Red-Tigo-Eurobikes | + 12' 25" |
| 6 | Alex Julajuj (GUA) | Ópticas Deluxe-Ninosport | + 13' 51" |
| 7 | Sergio Chumil (GUA) | Ejercito de Guatemala | + 14' 40" |
| 8 | Harold López (ECU) | Best PC Ecuador | + 16' 25" |
| 9 | Fredy Toc (GUA) | A.C. Chimaltenango-Comayma-Linaflor | + 19' 55" |
| 10 | Francisco Osweli González (GUA) | Decorabaños | + 23' 10" |

=== Points classification ===
Final points classification (1–10)
| Rank | Rider | Team | Points |
|---|---|---|---|
| 1 | Byron Guamá (ECU) | Best PC Ecuador | 109 |
| 2 | Christofer Jurado (PAN) | Panama | 101 |
| 3 | Mardoqueo Vásquez (GUA) | Hino-One-La Red-Tigo-Eurobikes | 97 |
| 4 | Harold López (ECU) | Best PC Ecuador | 90 |
| 5 | Santiago Ordoñez (COL) | Canel's–Zerouno | 82 |
| 6 | Francisco Osweli González (GUA) | Decorabaños | 78 |
| 7 | Leonardo González (GUA) | A.C. Chimaltenango-Comayma-Linaflor | 66 |
| 8 | Alex Julajuj (GUA) | Ópticas Deluxe-Ninosport | 65 |
| 9 | Roberto González (PAN) | Panama | 65 |
| 10 | Sergio Chumil (GUA) | Ejercito de Guatemala | 64 |

=== Mountains classification ===
Final mountains classification (1–10)
| Rank | Rider | Team | Points |
|---|---|---|---|
| 1 | Byron Guamá (ECU) | Best PC Ecuador | 62 |
| 2 | Mardoqueo Vásquez (GUA) | Hino-One-La Red-Tigo-Eurobikes | 57 |
| 3 | Francisco Osweli González (GUA) | Decorabaños | 48 |
| 4 | Celso Ajpacajá (GUA) | ASO San Marcos-Acredicom | 38 |
| 5 | Fredy Toc (GUA) | A.C. Chimaltenango-Comayma-Linaflor | 24 |
| 7 | Harold López (ECU) | Best PC Ecuador | 14 |
| 6 | Luis Fernando López (HON) | Ópticas Deluxe-Ninosport | 13 |
| 8 | Alfredo Ajpacajá (GUA) | Decorabaños | 10 |
| 9 | Esdras Morales (GUA) | Hino-One-La Red-Tigo-Eurobikes | 8 |
| 10 | Leonardo González (GUA) | A.C. Chimaltenango-Comayma-Linaflor | 7 |

=== Sprints classification ===
Final sprints classification (1–10)
| Rank | Rider | Team | Points |
|---|---|---|---|
| 1 | Cristian Pita (ECU) | Best PC Ecuador | 34 |
| 2 | Ignacio Prado (MEX) | Canel's–Zerouno | 32 |
| 3 | Brayan Ríos (GUA) | ASO Quiche-India Quiche | 29 |
| 4 | Byron Guamá (ECU) | Best PC Ecuador | 16 |
| 5 | Celso Ajpacajá (GUA) | ASO San Marcos-Acredicom | 13 |
| 6 | Henry Sam (GUA) | Decorabaños | 9 |
| 7 | Alfredo Ajpacajá (GUA) | Decorabaños | 8 |
| 8 | Luis Fernando López (HON) | Ópticas Deluxe-Ninosport | 8 |
| 9 | Francisco Osweli González (GUA) | Decorabaños | 6 |
| 10 | Leonardo González (GUA) | A.C. Chimaltenango-Comayma-Linaflor | 5 |

=== Young rider classification ===
Final young rider classification (1–10)
| Rank | Rider | Team | Time |
|---|---|---|---|
| 1 | Alex Julajuj (GUA) | Ópticas Deluxe-Ninosport | 31h 54' 35" |
| 2 | Sergio Chumil (GUA) | Ejercito de Guatemala | + 49" |
| 3 | Harold López (ECU) | Best PC Ecuador | + 2' 34" |
| 4 | Melvin Boron (GUA) | Ejercito de Guatemala | + 38' 08" |
| 5 | Victor Tuiz (GUA) | Ejercito de Guatemala | + 46' 59" |
| 6 | Ervin Perez (GUA) | A.C. Chimaltenango-Comayma-Linaflor | + 57' 22" |
| 7 | Pedro Pablo Morales (GUA) | Ejercito de Guatemala | + 1h 08' 40" |
| 8 | William Tiam (GUA) | Ópticas Deluxe-Ninosport | + 1h 11' 37" |
| 9 | Bryan Sacor (GUA) | ASO Quetzaltenalgo-C.Castelli | + 1h 18' 16" |
| 10 | Alfredo Bulux (GUA) | ASO Quiche-India Quiche | + 1h 46' 30" |

=== Guatemalan rider classification ===
Final Guatemalan rider classification (1–10)
| Rank | Rider | Team | Time |
|---|---|---|---|
| 1 | Mardoqueo Vásquez (GUA) | Hino-One-La Red-Tigo-Eurobikes | 31h 40' 44" |
| 2 | Leonardo González (GUA) | A.C. Chimaltenango-Comayma-Linaflor | + 10' 53" |
| 3 | Gerson Toc (GUA) | Hino-One-La Red-Tigo-Eurobikes | + 12' 25" |
| 4 | Alex Julajuj (GUA) | Ópticas Deluxe-Ninosport | + 13' 51" |
| 5 | Sergio Chumil (GUA) | Ejercito de Guatemala | + 14' 40" |
| 6 | Fredy Toc (GUA) | A.C. Chimaltenango-Comayma-Linaflor | + 19' 55" |
| 7 | Francisco Osweli González (GUA) | Decorabaños | + 23' 10" |
| 8 | Edgar Torres (GUA) | Hino-One-La Red-Tigo-Eurobikes | + 27' 34" |
| 9 | Esdras Morales (GUA) | Hino-One-La Red-Tigo-Eurobikes | + 36' 47" |
| 10 | Celso Ajpacajá (GUA) | ASO San Marcos-Acredicom | + 39' 46" |

=== Team classification ===
Final team classification (1–10)
| Rank | Team | Time |
|---|---|---|
| 1 | Hino-One-La Red-Tigo-Eurobikes | 95h 29' 48" |
| 2 | Decorabaños | + 55' 42" |
| 3 | Best PC Ecuador | + 56' 24" |
| 4 | A.C. Chimaltenango-Comayma-Linaflor | + 1h 12' 26" |
| 5 | Ejercito de Guatemala | + 1h 22' 31" |
| 6 | Ópticas Deluxe-Ninosport | + 1h 27' 32" |
| 7 | Panama | + 2h 04' 05" |
| 8 | Canel's–Zerouno | + 2h 39' 11" |
| 9 | Dicafriem | + 2h 43' 33" |
| 10 | ASO San Marcos-Acredicom | + 3h 05' 38" |
