= 2016 Latin American Table Tennis Championships =

The 2016 Latin American Table Tennis Championships were held in San Juan, Puerto Rico from February 1 to February 7, 2016.

== Medal summary ==
=== Events ===
Event	Gold	Silver	Bronze
Men's singles	(Brazil) Hugo Calderano	(Ecuador) Alberto Mino	(Argentina) Horacio Cifuentes
Men's singles	(Brazil) Hugo Calderano	(Ecuador) Alberto Mino	(Brazil) Eric Jouti
Women's singles	(Brazil) Gui Lin	(Brazil) Caroline Kumahara	(Brazil) Lígia Silva
Women's singles	(Brazil) Gui Lin	(Brazil) Caroline Kumahara	(Brazil) Bruna Takahashi
Men's doubles	(Argentina) Gaston Alto (Argentina) Pablo Tabachnik	(Puerto Rico) Brian Afanador (Puerto Rico) Daniel Gonzalez	(Brazil) Vitor Ishiy (Brazil) Eric Jouti
Men's doubles	(Argentina) Gaston Alto (Argentina) Pablo Tabachnik	(Puerto Rico) Brian Afanador (Puerto Rico) Daniel Gonzalez	(Mexico) Marcos Madrid (Mexico) Salvador Uribe
Women's doubles	(Venezuela) Gremlis Arvelo (Venezuela) Neridee Nino	(Argentina) Camila Arguelles (Argentina) Ana Codina	(Chile) Katherine Low (Chile) Paulina Vega
Women's doubles	(Venezuela) Gremlis Arvelo (Venezuela) Neridee Nino	(Argentina) Camila Arguelles (Argentina) Ana Codina	(Puerto Rico) Carelyn Cordero (Puerto Rico) Daniely Ríos
Mixed doubles	(Brazil) Vitor Ishiy (Brazil) Caroline Kumahara	(Argentina) Pablo Tabachnik (Argentina) Ana Codina	(Puerto Rico) Brian Afanador (Puerto Rico) Adriana Diaz
Mixed doubles	(Brazil) Vitor Ishiy (Brazil) Caroline Kumahara	(Argentina) Pablo Tabachnik (Argentina) Ana Codina	(Argentina) Rodrigo Gilabert (Argentina) Candela Molero
Men's singles U21	(Puerto Rico) Brian Afanador	(Paraguay) Alejandro Toranzos	(Brazil) Vitor Ishiy
Men's singles U21	(Puerto Rico) Brian Afanador	(Paraguay) Alejandro Toranzos	(Argentina) Horacio Cifuentes
Women's singles U21	(Puerto Rico) Adriana Díaz	(Puerto Rico) Melanie Díaz	(Uruguay) Maria Lorenzotti
Women's singles U21	(Puerto Rico) Adriana Díaz	(Puerto Rico) Melanie Díaz	(Chile) Daniela Ortega
Men's team	Brazil; Hugo Calderano; Eric Jouti; Vitor Ishiy; Humberto Manhani	Argentina; Gaston Alto; Pablo Tabachnik; Rodrigo Gilabert; Horacio Cifuentes	Chile; Felipe Olivares; Juan Lamadrid; Gustavo Gomez; Alejandro Rodriguez
Men's team	Brazil; Hugo Calderano; Eric Jouti; Vitor Ishiy; Humberto Manhani	Argentina; Gaston Alto; Pablo Tabachnik; Rodrigo Gilabert; Horacio Cifuentes	Ecuador; Alberto Mino; Geovanny Coello; Rodrigo Tapia
Women's team	Brazil; Gui Lin; Caroline Kumahara; Bruna Takahashi; Lígia Silva	Puerto Rico; Adriana Díaz; Melanie Díaz; Daniely Ríos; Carelyn Cordero	Chile; Paulina Vega; Katherine Low; Karen Rojas; Daniela Ortega
Women's team	Brazil; Gui Lin; Caroline Kumahara; Bruna Takahashi; Lígia Silva	Puerto Rico; Adriana Díaz; Melanie Díaz; Daniely Ríos; Carelyn Cordero	Venezuela; Gremlis Arvelo; Neridee Nino; Wimberly Montero

=== Medal table ===
Rank	Nation	Gold	Silver	Bronze	Total
1	Brazil	5	1	5	11
2	Puerto Rico	2	3	2	7
3	Argentina	1	3	3	7
4	Venezuela	1	0	1	2
5	Ecuador	0	1	1	2
6	Paraguay	0	1	0	1
7	Chile	0	0	4	4
8	Mexico	0	0	1	1
8	Uruguay	0	0	1	1
Totals (9 entries)		9	9	18	36

== Results ==
=== Men's singles ===
==== Finals ====
Semifinals							Final
1	(Brazil) Hugo Calderano	11	11	11	11	12
	(Argentina) Horacio Cifuentes	4	13	8	7	10	1	(Brazil) Hugo Calderano	14	11	15	11
3	(Ecuador) Alberto Mino	11	11	11	9	11	3	(Ecuador) Alberto Mino	12	3	13	9
6	(Brazil) Eric Jouti	8	9	6	11	8

==== Top draw ====
First round
1	(Brazil) Hugo Calderano	11	11	11	12
(Puerto Rico) Richard Pietri	8	6	2	10
(Ecuador) Rodrigo Tapia	10	11	5	4	6
(Peru) Bryan Blas	12	7	11	11	11
(Chile) Felipe Olivares	11	11	11	11
(Venezuela) Luis Diaz	8	6	7	5
(Jamaica) Simon Tomlinson	9	11	8	11	5
8	(Argentina) Pablo Tabachnik	11	13	11	9	11
5	(Paraguay) Marcelo Aguirre	5	9	6	10
(Peru) Diego Rodríguez	11	11	11	12
(Venezuela) Jan Medina	6	4	4	11	1
(Brazil) Humberto Manhani	11	11	11	7	11
(Argentina) Horacio Cifuentes	16	11	10	11	11
(Ecuador) Geovanny Coello	14	9	12	8	2
(Panama) Omar Avi-Tal	8	11	6	3	11	8
4	(Puerto Rico) Brian Afanador	11	7	11	11	7	11

Second round
1	(Brazil) Hugo Calderano	13	11	11	11
(Peru) Bryan Blas	11	6	8	6
(Chile) Felipe Olivares	11	11	11	13
8	(Argentina) Pablo Tabachnik	5	6	7	11
(Peru) Diego Rodríguez	11	11	11	11
(Brazil) Humberto Manhani	9	8	9	3
(Argentina) Horacio Cifuentes	12	11	12	11
4	(Puerto Rico) Brian Afanador	10	6	10	5

Quarterfinals
1	(Brazil) Hugo Calderano	11	11	11	11
(Chile) Felipe Olivares	7	4	9	7
(Peru) Diego Rodríguez	6	7	11	11	9	9
(Argentina) Horacio Cifuentes	11	11	9	6	11	11

Semifinals
1	(Brazil) Hugo Calderano
(Argentina) Horacio Cifuentes

==== Bottom draw ====
First round
3	(Ecuador) Alberto Mino	11	11	11	11
(Guatemala) Heber Moscoso	5	7	2	3
(Chile) Gustavo Gomez	6	1	4	9
(Brazil) Vitor Ishiy	11	11	11	11
(Venezuela) Marco Navas	11	11	10	10	11	12	6
(Puerto Rico) Hector Berrios	9	7	12	12	6	14	11
(Mexico) Salvador Uribe	12	4	7	7
7	(Argentina) Gaston Alto	14	11	11	11
6	(Brazil) Eric Jouti	11	11	12	11
(Dominican Republic) Samuel Galvez	9	8	10	8
(Paraguay) Alejandro Toranzos	W.O
(Argentina) Rodrigo Gilabert
(Puerto Rico) Daniel Gonzalez	9	11	11	11	11
(Jamaica) Michael Hyatt	11	4	4	0	0
(Chile) Juan Lamadrid	W.O
2	(Mexico) Marcos Madrid

Second round
3	(Ecuador) Alberto Mino	11	11	11	11
(Brazil) Vitor Ishiy	7	4	3	6
(Puerto Rico) Hector Berrios	11	11	11	11	11	11
7	(Argentina) Gaston Alto	13	8	13	6	4	5
6	(Brazil) Eric Jouti	11	11	12	11
(Argentina) Rodrigo Gilabert	7	7	10	6
(Puerto Rico) Daniel Gonzalez	5	11	12	2	8
2	(Mexico) Marcos Madrid	11	13	10	11	11

Quarterfinals
3	(Ecuador) Alberto Mino	11	11	11	11
(Puerto Rico) Hector Berrios	5	7	9	7
6	(Brazil) Eric Jouti	12	6	11	9	11	5	11
2	(Mexico) Marcos Madrid	10	11	8	11	8	11	5

Semifinals
3	(Ecuador) Alberto Mino
6	(Brazil) Eric Jouti

=== Women's singles ===
==== Finals ====
Semifinals							Final
6	(Brazil) Lígia Silva	3	5	8	7
3	(Brazil) Caroline Kumahara	11	11	11	11		3	(Brazil) Caroline Kumahara	11	11	11	10	7
4	(Brazil) Bruna Takahashi	5	7	11	9	11	2	(Brazil) Gui Lin	8	13	9	12	11
2	(Brazil) Gui Lin	11	11	8	11	8

==== Top draw ====
First round
1	(Puerto Rico) Adriana Díaz	11	11	11	10	11
(Chile) Karen Rojas	1	7	4	12	4
(Cuba) Idalys Lovet	11	11	11	10	10	11
(Argentina) Camila Arguelles	9	5	9	12	12	6
(Venezuela) Gremlis Arvelo	11	11	11	3	14
(Chile) Daniela Ortega	7	8	9	11	12
(Mexico) Mercedes Madrid	6	5	8	5
6	(Brazil) Lígia Silva	11	11	11	11
8	(Chile) Paulina Vega	11	11	11	13
(Venezuela) Winberly Montero	8	7	8	11
(Peru) Janina Nieto	9	11	11	8	11	11	7
(Dominican Republic) Eva Brito	11	3	13	11	8	6	11
(Uruguay) Maria Lorenzotti	11	13	11	11	11
(Puerto Rico) Carelyn Cordero	13	11	7	8	7
(Ecuador) Nathaly Paredes	7	4	6	4
3	(Brazil) Caroline Kumahara	11	11	11	11

Second round
1	(Puerto Rico) Adriana Díaz	12	13	8	11	11
(Cuba) Idalys Lovet	10	11	11	7	5
(Venezuela) Gremlis Arvelo	9	4	8	7
6	(Brazil) Lígia Silva	11	11	11	11
8	(Chile) Paulina Vega	11	11	11	11
(Dominican Republic) Eva Brito	9	7	7	6
(Uruguay) Maria Lorenzotti	11	6	6	75
3	(Brazil) Caroline Kumahara	5	11	11	11	11

Quarterfinals
1	(Puerto Rico) Adriana Díaz	11	8	11	11	4	9	9
6	(Brazil) Lígia Silva	7	11	9	8	11	11	11
8	(Chile) Paulina Vega	7	10	11	5	3
3	(Brazil) Caroline Kumahara	11	12	7	11	11

Semifinals
6	(Brazil) Lígia Silva
3	(Brazil) Caroline Kumahara

==== Bottom draw ====
First round
4	(Brazil) Bruna Takahashi	11	11	11	11
(Mexico) Monica Serrano	7	3	5	6
(Peru) Angela Mori	6	11	11	9	7	8
(Chile) Katherine Low	11	5	3	11	11	11
(Puerto Rico) Melanie Diaz	11	11	11	11
(Argentina) Candela Molero	5	8	8	3
(Dominican Republic) Yasiris Ortiz	5	8	8	3
7	(Colombia) Paula Medina	11	11	11	11
5	(Mexico) Yadira Silva	11	11	11	11
(Peru) Gabriela Soto	6	4	3	8
(Puerto Rico) Daniely Rios	11	11	10	8	10
(Venezuela) Neridee Nino	6	13	12	11	12
(Argentina) Ana Codina	7	11	11	12	11
(Puerto Rico) Gabriela Diaz	11	5	5	10	3
(Dominican Republic) Johenny Valdez	6	9	7	11	8
2	(Brazil) Gui Lin	11	11	11	8	11

Second round
4	(Brazil) Bruna Takahashi	11	13	11	10	14
(Chile) Katherine Low	6	11	9	12	12
(Puerto Rico) Melanie Diaz	9	8	9	9
7	(Colombia) Paula Medina	11	11	11	11
5	(Mexico) Yadira Silva	11	9	11	9	11	11
(Venezuela) Neridee Nino	4	11	4	11	3	4
(Argentina) Ana Codina	11	6	9	9	9
2	(Brazil) Gui Lin	5	11	11	11	11

Quarterfinals
4	(Brazil) Bruna Takahashi	11	11	6	9	8	11	11
7	(Colombia) Paula Medina	9	7	11	11	11	8	5
5	(Mexico) Yadira Silva	11	11	7	11	7	13
2	(Brazil) Gui Lin	8	13	11	9	11	15

Semifinals
4	(Brazil) Bruna Takahashi
2	(Brazil) Gui Lin

=== Men's doubles ===
==== Finals ====
Semifinals						Final
1	(Argentina) Gaston Alto (Argentina) Pablo Tabachnik	11	11	11
3	(Brazil) Vitor Ishiy (Brazil) Eric Jouti	5	8	8		1	(Argentina) Gaston Alto (Argentina) Pablo Tabachnik	11	11	11	11
4	(Mexico) Marcos Madrid (Mexico) Salvador Uribe	11	8	10	6	2	(Puerto Rico) Brian Afanador (Puerto Rico) Daniel Gonzalez	13	5	5	8
2	(Puerto Rico) Brian Afanador (Puerto Rico) Daniel Gonzalez	2	11	12	11

==== Top draw ====
First round
(Peru) Johan Chavez (Peru) Cesar Luque	5	10	11	11	8
(Mexico) Miguel Lara (Mexico) Ricardo Villa	11	12	7	9	11
(Guatemala) Hector Gatica (Guatemala) Heber Moscoso	9	11	11	11
(Puerto Rico) Sebastian Echevarria (Puerto Rico) Francisco Matias	11	9	8	8
(Trinidad and Tobago) Khaleel Asgarali (Trinidad and Tobago) Aaron Wilson	6	9	11	6
(Puerto Rico) Hector Berrios (Puerto Rico) Yomar Gonzalez	11	11	8	11

Second round
1	(Argentina) Gaston Alto (Argentina) Pablo Tabachnik	11	11	11
(Mexico) Miguel Lara (Mexico) Ricardo Villa	8	8	4
(Guatemala) Hector Gatica (Guatemala) Heber Moscoso	9	11	11	11
7	(Ecuador) Alberto Mino (Ecuador) Rodrigo Tapia	11	9	8	8
8	(Chile) Gustavo Gomez (Chile) Juan Lamadrid	8	11	11	6	11
(Puerto Rico) Hector Berrios (Puerto Rico) Yomar Gonzalez	11	3	5	11	7
(Jamaica) Michael Hyatt (Jamaica) Kane Watson	6	13	5	3
3	(Brazil) Vitor Ishiy (Brazil) Eric Jouti	11	11	11	11

Quarterfinals
1	(Argentina) Gaston Alto (Argentina) Pablo Tabachnik	11	11	11
(Guatemala) Hector Gatica (Guatemala) Heber Moscoso	8	8	4
8	(Chile) Gustavo Gomez (Chile) Juan Lamadrid	8	3	11
3	(Brazil) Vitor Ishiy (Brazil) Eric Jouti	11	11	13

Semifinals
1	(Argentina) Gaston Alto (Argentina) Pablo Tabachnik	11	11	11
3	(Brazil) Vitor Ishiy (Brazil) Eric Jouti	5	8	8

==== Bottom draw ====
First round
(Peru) Bryan Blas (Peru) Diego Rodriguez	11	11	4	11
(Puerto Rico) José González (Puerto Rico) Richard Pietri	5	4	11	4
(Uruguay) Daythian Daghero (Uruguay) Bruno Moleda	7	0	4
(Dominican Republic) Samuel Galvez (Dominican Republic) Emil Santos	11	11	11

Second round
4	(Mexico) Marcos Madrid (Mexico) Salvador Uribe	11	11	11
(Venezuela) Luis Diaz (Venezuela) Marco Navas	8	9	4
(Peru) Bryan Blas (Peru) Diego Rodriguez	4	9	7
5	(Argentina) Horacio Cifuentes (Argentina) Rodrigo Gilabert	11	11	11
6	(Paraguay) Marcelo Aguirre (Paraguay) Alejandro Toranzos	12	11	11
(Dominican Republic) Samuel Galvez (Dominican Republic) Emil Santos	10	8	5
(Chile) Felipe Olivares (Chile) Alejandro Rodríguez	5	5	4
2	(Puerto Rico) Brian Afanador (Puerto Rico) Daniel Gonzalez	11	11	11

Quarterfinals
4	(Mexico) Marcos Madrid (Mexico) Salvador Uribe	11	11	11
5	(Argentina) Horacio Cifuentes (Argentina) Rodrigo Gilabert	8	9	4
6	(Paraguay) Marcelo Aguirre (Paraguay) Alejandro Toranzos	7	11	6	11	7
2	(Puerto Rico) Brian Afanador (Puerto Rico) Daniel Gonzalez	11	6	11	3	11

Semifinals
4	(Mexico) Marcos Madrid (Mexico) Salvador Uribe	11	8	10	6
2	(Puerto Rico) Brian Afanador (Puerto Rico) Daniel Gonzalez	2	11	12	11

=== Women's doubles ===
==== Finals ====
Semifinals							Final
6	(Argentina) Camila Arguelles (Argentina) Ana Codina	11	13	9	9	12
5	(Chile) Katherine Low (Chile) Paulina Vega	9	11	11	11	10	6	(Argentina) Camila Arguelles (Argentina) Ana Codina	6	17	11	12	8
	(Venezuela) Gremlis Arvelo (Venezuela) Neridee Nino	11	11	12				(Venezuela) Gremlis Arvelo (Venezuela) Neridee Nino	11	19	5	10	11
8	(Puerto Rico) Carelyn Cordero (Puerto Rico) Daniely Rios	6	4	10

==== Top draw ====
First round
(Mexico) Maria Alanis (Mexico) Monica Serrano	11	10	11	8	8
(El Salvador) Emme Arias (El Salvador) Estefania Ramirios	6	12	8	11	11
(Dominican Republic) Eva Brito (Dominican Republic) Yasiris Ortiz	11	12	11
(Ecuador) Daniela Camino (Ecuador) Astrid Salazar	4	10	8

Second round
1	(Brazil) Gui Lin (Brazil) Caroline Kumahara	12	11	11
(El Salvador) Emme Arias (El Salvador) Estefania Ramirios	10	6	8
(Puerto Rico) Lineris Rivera (Puerto Rico) Paola Sanabria	5	2	8
6	(Argentina) Camila Arguelles (Argentina) Ana Codina	11	11	11
5	(Chile) Katherine Low (Chile) Paulina Vega	8	11	11	14
(Peru) Marisol Espineira (Peru) Angela Mori	11	9	8	12
(Dominican Republic) Eva Brito (Dominican Republic) Yasiris Ortiz	7	11	11	7	5
3	(Puerto Rico) Adriana Diaz (Puerto Rico) Melanie Diaz	11	7	9	11	11

Quarterfinals
1	(Brazil) Gui Lin (Brazil) Caroline Kumahara	4	12	8	7
6	(Argentina) Camila Arguelles (Argentina) Ana Codina	11	10	11	11
5	(Chile) Katherine Low (Chile) Paulina Vega	11	11	11
3	(Puerto Rico) Adriana Diaz (Puerto Rico) Melanie Diaz	8	5	6

Semifinals
6	(Argentina) Camila Arguelles (Argentina) Ana Codina	11	13	9	9	12
5	(Chile) Katherine Low (Chile) Paulina Vega	9	11	11	11	10

==== Bottom draw ====
First round
(Chile) Daniela Ortega (Chile) Karen Rojas	11	11	11
(Puerto Rico) Gabriela Diaz (Puerto Rico) Ana Paola Rivera	9	8	6
(Trinidad and Tobago) Rheann Chung (Trinidad and Tobago) Catherine Spicer	17	14	6	4	10
(Argentina) Agustina Iwasa (Argentina) Candela Molero	15	12	11	11	12

Second round
4	(Colombia) Paula Medina (Colombia) Lady Ruano	10	11	8	6
(Venezuela) Gremlis Arvelo (Venezuela) Neridee Nino	12	8	11	11
(Chile) Daniela Ortega (Chile) Karen Rojas	15	9	7	3
7	(Mexico) Mercedes Madrid (Mexico) Yadira Silva	13	11	11	11
8	(Puerto Rico) Carelyn Cordero (Puerto Rico) Daniely Rios	11	11	14	11
(Argentina) Agustina Iwasa (Argentina) Candela Molero	13	6	12	7
(Peru) Janina Nieto (Peru) Gabriela Soto	6	11	11	13
2	(Brazil) Lígia Silva (Brazil) Bruna Takahashi	11	8	7	11

Quarterfinals
(Venezuela) Gremlis Arvelo (Venezuela) Neridee Nino	11	10	11	11
7	(Mexico) Mercedes Madrid (Mexico) Yadira Silva	7	12	8	4
8	(Puerto Rico) Carelyn Cordero (Puerto Rico) Daniely Rios	10	11	9	11	11
(Peru) Janina Nieto (Peru) Gabriela Soto	12	4	11	6	2

Semifinals
(Venezuela) Gremlis Arvelo (Venezuela) Neridee Nino	11	11	12
8	(Puerto Rico) Carelyn Cordero (Puerto Rico) Daniely Rios	6	4	10

=== Mixed doubles ===
==== Finals ====
Semifinals							Final
1	(Puerto Rico) Brian Afanador (Puerto Rico) Adriana Diaz	10	11	10	11	8
7	(Argentina) Pablo Tabachnik (Argentina) Ana Codina	12	7	12	4	11	7	(Argentina) Pablo Tabachnik (Argentina) Ana Codina	7	14	8	8
4	(Brazil) Vitor Ishiy (Brazil) Caroline Kumahara	11	12	10	11		4	(Brazil) Vitor Ishiy (Brazil) Caroline Kumahara	11	12	11	11
	(Argentina) Rodrigo Gilabert (Argentina) Candela Molero	4	10	12	3

==== Preliminary ====
Round of 64
(Venezuela) Marco Navas (Venezuela) Gremlis Arvelo	3–0	(Trinidad and Tobago) Aaron Wilson (Trinidad and Tobago) Catherine Spicer	11–4, 11–5, 12–10
(Puerto Rico) Richard Pietri (Puerto Rico) Lineris Rivera	3–1	(Peru) Johan Chavez (Peru) Janina Nieto	11–3, 7–11, 11–8, 11–5
(Dominican Republic) Isaac Vila (Dominican Republic) Yasiris Ortiz	3–2	(Puerto Rico) Sebastian Echevarria (Puerto Rico) Gabriela Diaz	9–11, 11–3, 7–11, 11–5, 11–4
(Peru) Diego Rodriguez (Peru) Marisol Espineira	3–1	(Mexico) Miguel Lara (Mexico) Maria Alanis	5–11, 11–8, 11–7, 11–2

==== Top draw ====
Round of 32
1	(Puerto Rico) Brian Afanador (Puerto Rico) Adriana Diaz	11	12	11	14	11
(Mexico) Ricardo Villa (Mexico) Monica Serrano	5	14	7	16	7
(Venezuela) Marco Navas (Venezuela) Gremlis Arvelo	4	15	11	6	11
(Dominican Republic) Emil Santos (Dominican Republic) Eva Brito	11	13	4	11	8
(Chile) Felipe Olivares (Chile) Daniela Ortega	11	5	11	13
(Puerto Rico) Richard Pietri (Puerto Rico) Lineris Rivera	7	11	6	11
(Ecuador) Rodrigo Tapia (Ecuador) Astrid Salazar	5	7	10
6	(Argentina) Gaston Alto (Argentina) Camila Arguelles	11	11	12
7	(Argentina) Pablo Tabachnik (Argentina) Ana Codina	11	10	11	10	11
(Dominican Republic) Isaac Vila (Dominican Republic) Yasiris Ortiz	9	12	7	12	8
(Ecuador) Geovanny Coello (Ecuador) Nathaly Paredes	6	11	11	3
(Chile) Gustavo Gomez (Chile) Katherine Low	11	13	5	11
(Puerto Rico) Hector Berrios (Puerto Rico) Carelyn Cordero	11	9	11	11
(El Salvador) Julio Calderon (El Salvador) Emme Arias	3	11	8	5
(Peru) Diego Rodriguez (Peru) Marisol Espineira	8	4	4
3	(Brazil) Eric Jouti (Brazil) Gui Lin	11	11	11

Round of 16
1	(Puerto Rico) Brian Afanador (Puerto Rico) Adriana Diaz	9	11	11	6	11
(Venezuela) Marco Navas (Venezuela) Gremlis Arvelo	11	4	6	11	7
(Chile) Felipe Olivares (Chile) Daniela Ortega	6	6	8
6	(Argentina) Gaston Alto (Argentina) Camila Arguelles	11	11	11
7	(Argentina) Pablo Tabachnik (Argentina) Ana Codina	11	11	3	9	11
(Chile) Gustavo Gomez (Chile) Katherine Low	7	9	11	11	6
(Puerto Rico) Hector Berrios (Puerto Rico) Carelyn Cordero	11	7	7	7
3	(Brazil) Eric Jouti (Brazil) Gui Lin	8	11	11	11

Quarterfinals
1	(Puerto Rico) Brian Afanador (Puerto Rico) Adriana Diaz	11	11	11
6	(Argentina) Gaston Alto (Argentina) Camila Arguelles	9	8	9
7	(Argentina) Pablo Tabachnik (Argentina) Ana Codina	7	11	11	11
3	(Brazil) Eric Jouti (Brazil) Gui Lin	11	7	8	6

Semifinals
1	(Puerto Rico) Brian Afanador (Puerto Rico) Adriana Diaz	10	11	10	11	8
7	(Argentina) Pablo Tabachnik (Argentina) Ana Codina	12	7	12	4	11

==== Bottom draw ====
First round
4	(Brazil) Vitor Ishiy (Brazil) Caroline Kumahara	11	11	8	11
(Mexico) Salvador Uribe (Mexico) Mercedes Madrid	7	9	11	9
(Dominican Republic) Samuel Galvez (Dominican Republic) Johenny Valdez	7	7	8
(Chile) Juan Lamadrid (Chile) Karen Rojas	11	11	11
(Argentina) Horacio Cifuentes (Argentina) Agustina Iwasa	11	11	1	11
(Uruguay) Gonzalo Lorenzotti (Uruguay) Maria Lorenzotti	6	6	11	7
(Peru) Cesar Luque (Peru) Angela Mori	10	8	11	5
8	(Puerto Rico) Daniel Gonzalez (Puerto Rico) Melanie Diaz	12	11	9	11
5	(Brazil) Humberto Manhani (Brazil) Bruna Takahashi	6	11	11	11
(Ecuador) Alberto Mino (Ecuador) Daniela Camino	11	5	7	6
(Puerto Rico) Yomar Gonzalez (Puerto Rico) Daniely Rios	9	8	4
(Peru) Bryan Blas (Peru) Gabriela Soto	11	11	11
(Argentina) Rodrigo Gilabert (Argentina) Candela Molero	6	8	11	11	11
(Chile) Alejandro Rodriguez (Chile) Paulina Vega	11	11	9	7	7
(Venezuela) Luis Diaz (Venezuela) Winberly Montero	11	8	4	11	11
2	(Mexico) Marcos Madrid (Mexico) Yadira Silva	5	11	11	9	9

Second round
4	(Brazil) Vitor Ishiy (Brazil) Caroline Kumahara	11	11	11
(Chile) Juan Lamadrid (Chile) Karen Rojas	5	8	8
(Argentina) Horacio Cifuentes (Argentina) Agustina Iwasa	7	13	7	5
4	(Puerto Rico) Daniel Gonzalez (Puerto Rico) Melanie Diaz	11	11	11	11
5	(Brazil) Humberto Manhani (Brazil) Bruna Takahashi	11	7	8	7
(Peru) Bryan Blas (Peru) Gabriela Soto	6	11	11	11
(Argentina) Rodrigo Gilabert (Argentina) Candela Molero	13	3	11	11	11
(Venezuela) Luis Diaz (Venezuela) Winberly Montero	15	11	8	9	7

Quarterfinals
4	(Brazil) Vitor Ishiy (Brazil) Caroline Kumahara	11	11	11
4	(Puerto Rico) Daniel Gonzalez (Puerto Rico) Melanie Diaz	6	9	6
(Peru) Bryan Blas (Peru) Gabriela Soto	5	16	8	8
(Argentina) Rodrigo Gilabert (Argentina) Candela Molero	11	14	11	11

Semifinals
4	(Brazil) Vitor Ishiy (Brazil) Caroline Kumahara	11	12	10	11
(Argentina) Rodrigo Gilabert (Argentina) Candela Molero	4	10	12	3

=== Men's team ===
==== Group A ====
Team	Pld	W	L	GW	GL	Pts
Brazil	2	2	0	6	0	4
Peru	2	1	1	3	4	3
Guatemala	2	0	2	1	6	2

1 February 2016; 10:00	Report	Brazil	3–0	Peru
Score by game:
Vitor Ishiy	3–1	Bryan Blas
Hugo Calderano	3–0	Diego Rodríguez
Eric Jouti / Vitor Ishiy	3–0	Johan Chavez / Bryan Blas

1 February 2016; 16:00	Report	Guatemala	0–3	Brazil
Score by game:
Hector Gatica	1–3	Eric Jouti
Heber Moscoso	0–3	Humberto Manhani
Kevin Soto / Heber Moscoso	0–3	Vitor Ishiy / Eric Jouti

2 February 2016; 10:00	Report	Peru	3–1	Guatemala
Score by game:
Diego Rodríguez	0–3	Hector Gatica
Bryan Blas	3–2	Kevin Soto
Johan Chavez / Bryan Blas	3–1	Heber Moscoso / Hector Gatica
Diego Rodríguez	3–2	Heber Moscoso

==== Group B ====
Team	Pld	W	L	GW	GL	Pts
Argentina	2	2	0	6	1	4
Venezuela	2	1	1	3	4	3
Paraguay	2	0	2	2	6	2

1 February 2016; 10:00	Report	Venezuela	0–3	Argentina
Score by game:
Marco Navas	1–3	Rodrigo Gilabert
Luis Díaz	1–3	Gaston Alto
Jan Medina / Luis Díaz	1–3	Pablo Tabachnik / Gaston Alto

1 February 2016; 16:00	Report	Argentina	3–1	Paraguay
Score by game:
Rodrigo Gilabert	3–0	Mathias Ferreira
Gaston Alto	3–1	Marcelo Aguirre
Pablo Tabachnik / Gaston Alto	2–3	Alejandro Toranzos / Marcelo Aguirre
Rodrigo Gilabert	3–2	Alejandro Toranzos

2 February 2016; 10:00	Report	Venezuela	3–1	Paraguay
Score by game:
Marco Navas	3–0	Mathias Ferreira
Jan Medina	1–3	Marcelo Aguirre
Luis Díaz / Jan Medina	3–2	Alejandro Toranzos / Marcelo Aguirre
Marco Navas	3–0	Alejandro Toranzos

==== Group C ====
Team	Pld	W	L	GW	GL	Pts
Puerto Rico	2	2	0	6	2	4
Mexico	2	1	1	5	4	3
Dominican Republic	2	0	2	1	6	2

1 February 2016; 10:00	Report	Dominican Republic	1–3	Mexico
Score by game:
Isaac Vila	0–3	Salvador Uribe
Emil Santos	3–0	Miguel Lara
Samuel Gálvez / Emil Santos	2–3	Ricardo Villa / Salvador Uribe
Isaac Vila	0–3	Ricardo Villa

1 February 2016; 16:00	Report	Mexico	2–3	Puerto Rico
Score by game:
Salvador Uribe	3–1	Daniel González
Ricardo Villa	1–3	Brian Afanador
Miguel Lara / Ricardo Villa	1–3	Hector Berrios / Daniel González
Salvador Uribe	3–2	Hector Berrios
Ricardo Villa	0–3	Brian Afanador
–

2 February 2016; 10:00	Report	Puerto Rico	3–0	Dominican Republic
Score by game:
Brian Afanador	3–0	Isaac Vila
Daniel Gonzalez	3–1	Emil Santos
Hector Berrios / Daniel Gonzalez	3–0	Samuel Galvez / Isaac Vila

==== Group D ====
Team	Pld	W	L	GW	GL	Pts
Chile	2	2	0	6	2	4
Ecuador	2	1	1	5	3	3
Uruguay	2	0	2	0	6	2

1 February 2016; 10:00	Report	Chile	3–0	Uruguay
Score by game:
Felipe Olivares	3–0	Bruno Moleda
Juan Lamadrid	3–2	Gonzalo Lorenzotti
Alejandro Rodríguez / Felipe Olivares	3–0	Daythian Daghero / Bruno Moleda

1 February 2016; 16:00	Report	Ecuador	2–3	Chile
Score by game:
Alberto Mino	3–1	Juan Lamadrid
Rodrigo Tapia	1–3	Felipe Olivares
Geovanny Coello / Rodrigo Tapia	0–3	Gustavo Gomez / Juan Lamadrid
Alberto Mino	3–0	Gustavo Gomez
Geovanny Coello	2–3	Felipe Olivares
–

2 February 2016; 10:00	Report	Ecuador	3–0	Uruguay
Score by game:
Alberto Mino	3–0	Daythian Daghero
Geovanny Coello	3–0	Bruno Moleda
Rodrigo Tapia / Geovanny Coello	3–1	Gonzalo Lorenzotti / Bruno Moleda

=== Women's team ===
==== Group A ====
Team	Pld	W	L	GW	GL	Pts
Brazil	2	2	0	6	0	4
Venezuela	2	1	1	3	4	3
Peru	2	0	2	1	6	2

1 February 2016; 14:00	Report	Brazilia (Brazil)	3–0	Peru
Score by game:
Lin Gui	3–0	Gabriela Soto
Lígia Silva	3–1	Angela Mori
Caroline Kumahara / Lin Gui	3–0	Janina Nieto / Gabriela Soto

2 February 2016; 14:00	Report	Venezuela	0–3	Brazil
Score by game:
Gremlis Arvelo	2–3	Caroline Kumahara
Neridee Niño	1–3	Bruna Takahashi
Winberly Montero / Neridee Niño	0–3	Lin Gui / Caroline Kumahara

2 February 2016; 12:30	Report	Venezuela	3–1	Peru
Score by game:
Gremlis Arvelo	3–0	Angela Mori
Neridee Niño	3–1	Marisol Espineira
Winberly Montero / Neridee Niño	2–3	Gabriela Soto / Angela Mori
Gremlis Arvelo	3–2	Gabriela Soto

==== Group B ====
Team	Pld	W	L	GW	GL	Pts
Puerto Rico	3	3	0	9	0	6
Chile	3	2	1	6	5	5
Dominican Republic	3	1	2	5	8	4
Ecuador	3	0	3	2	9	3

1 February 2016; 14:00	Report	Puerto Rico	3–0	Dominican Republic
Score by game:
Adriana Diaz	3–0	Johenny Valdez
Melanie Diaz	3–1	Eva Brito
Daniely Rios / Melanie Diaz	3–1	Yasiris Ortiz / Eva Brito

1 February 2016; 14:00	Report	Chile	3–0	Ecuador
Score by game:
Paulina Vega	3–0	Astrid Salazar
Katherine Low	3–2	Nathaly Paredes
Daniela Ortega / Paulina Vega	3–0	Daniela Camino / Astrid Salazar

==== Group C ====
Team	Pld	W	L	GW	GL	Pts
Argentina	3	3	0	9	5	6
Colombia	3	2	1	8	4	5
Mexico	3	1	2	6	6	4
El Salvador	3	0	3	1	9	3

== See also ==
- 2016 ITTF World Tour
