= Panamanian National Road Championships =

National road cycling championships in Panama

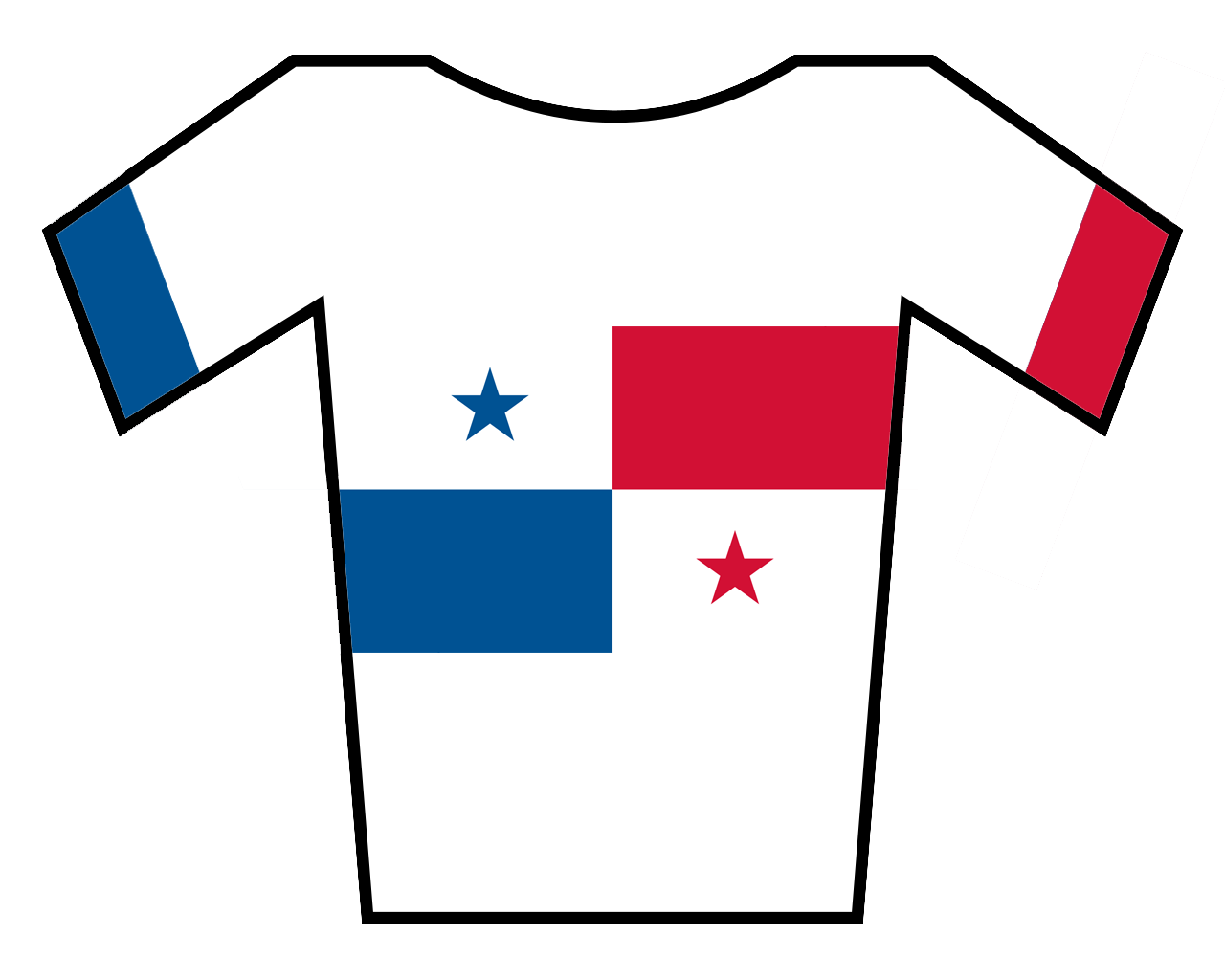

Race details
- Date: June
- Discipline: Road
- Type: One-day race

The Panamanian National Road Championship is a bike race held annually to decide the Panamanian cycling champions in both the road race and time trial disciplines, across many categories.

== Men ==
=== Road race ===
Year	Winner	Second	Third
2001	Jonathan Torres	Mario Ríos	Eibar Villareal
2002	Jonathan Torres	Mario Ríos	Eibar Villareal
2008	Jonathan Torres	Jair Suira	Fernando Ureña
2009	Fernando Ureña	Eibar Villareal	Hinol Hidalgo
2011	Nicolás Tenorio	Fabián Pino	Jorge González
2012	José Rodríguez	Jorge Castelblanco	Alcides Miranda
2013	Javier Ríos	Maicol Rodríguez	José de León
2014	Fernando Ureña	Jorge Castelblanco	Roberto González
2015	Jorge Castelblanco	Maicol Rodríguez	José Rodríguez
2016	Fernando Ureña	Francisco González	Franklin Archibold
2017	Christofer Jurado	Mohamed Méndez	Franklin Archibold
2018	Christofer Jurado	Roberto González	Jorge Castelblanco
2019	Jorge Castelblanco	Christofer Jurado	Bolivar Serrano
2020	Christofer Jurado	Bolivar Serrano	Randish Lorenzo
2021	Franklin Archibold	Christofer Jurado	Alex Strah
2022	Bolivar Serrano	Alex Strah	Randish Lorenzo
2023	Randish Lorenzo	Franklin Archibold	Sandi Guerra
2024	Franklin Archibold	Pablo Vásquez	Christofer Jurado

==== Under-23 ====
Year	Winner	Second	Third
2009	Jorge Castelblanco	Yelko Gómez	Maicol Rodríguez
2011	Nicolás Tenorio
2015	Cali Villalaz	Nolberto Hernández	Roberto González
2016	Franklin Archibold	Abdul Lorenzo	Carlos Samudio
2017	Christofer Jurado	Franklin Archibold	Abdul Lorenzo
2018	Franklin Archibold	Carlos Samudio	Juan Carlos Camargo
2019	Carlos Samudio	Randish Lorenzo	Augusto Salinas
2020	Joseph Guerra	Roberto Herrera	Allan Jaramillo
2021	Roberto Herrera	Hernán Aguilar	Nehemias Guerra
2022	Christopher Miranda	Bredio Ruiz	Roberto Herrera
2023	Bredio Ruiz	Roberto Herrera	José Pitti
2024	Michael Caballero	Cristopher Vargas	Kevin Almanza

=== Time trial ===
Year	Winner	Second	Third
2009	Mohamed Méndez	Leonel Juárez	Juan Gaudeano
2012	Ramón Carretero	David Pareja	Héctor Zepeda
2013	Héctor Zepeda	Maicol Rodríguez	Ramón Carretero
2014	Yelko Gómez	Roberto González	Héctor Zepeda
2015	Yelko Gómez	Roberto González	Héctor Zepeda
2016	Héctor Zepeda	Alcides Miranda	Rubén Samudio
2017	Franklin Archibold	Mohamed Méndez	Christofer Jurado
2018	Franklin Archibold	Yelko Gómez	Carlos Samudio
2019	Christofer Jurado	Jorge Castelblanco	Alex Strah
2020	Christofer Jurado	Franklin Archibold	Bolivar Serrano
2021	Christofer Jurado	Franklin Archibold	Bolivar Serrano
2022	Franklin Archibold	Christofer Jurado	Bolivar Serrano
2023	Bolívar Espinosa	Franklin Archibold	David de Jesús Díaz
2024	Franklin Archibold	Christofer Jurado	Bolívar Espinosa

==== Under-23 ====
Year	Winner	Second	Third
2009	Ramón Carretero	Moisés Sánchez	Guajardo Pandiella
2011	Ramón Carretero	José Rodríguez	Nicolás Tenorio
2016	Rubén Samudio	Carlos Samudio	Jonathan Coffre
2017	Franklin Archibold	Christofer Jurado	Alex Strah
2018	Franklin Archibold	Carlos Samudio	Bolivar Espinosa
2019	Carlos Samudio	Randish Lorenzo	Joseph Guerra
2020	Joseph Guerra	Eliot Burgos	Roberto Herrera
2021	Roberto Herrera	Hernán Aguilar	Eliot Saldaña
2022	Nehemias Guerra	Roberto Herrera	Christopher Miranda
2023	Cristopher Miranda	Pablo Vásquez	Bredio Ruiz
2024	Hassan Chan	Cristopher Miranda	Michael Caballero

== Women ==
Year	Road Race	Time Trial
2014	Yineth Kellyam Cubilla	Emma Jorge
2015	Yineth Kellyam Cubilla	Yineth Kellyam Cubilla
2016	Yineth Kellyam Cubilla	Yineth Kellyam Cubilla
2017	Fernanda Mendez	Anibel Prieto
2018	Yineth Kellyam Cubilla	Anibel Prieto
2019	Shaina Rodriguez	Argelis Bernal
2020	Cristina Mata	Cristina Mata
2021	Wendy Ducreux	Cristina Mata
2022	Wendy Ducreux	Cristina Mata
2023	Wendy Ducreux	Anibel Prieto
2024	Wendy Ducreux	Wendy Ducreux
