= Guatemalan National Road Championships =

Cycling championship

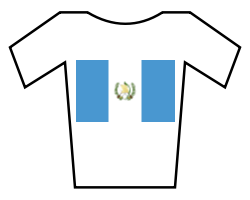

Race details
- Date: June
- Discipline: Road
- Type: One-day race

The Guatemalan National Road Championships are held annually to decide the cycling champions in both the road race and time trial discipline, across various categories.

== Men ==
=== Road race ===
Year	Winner	Second	Third
1953	Jorge Surqué Canel
1954	Julio Folgar
1955	Jorge Surqué Canel
1956	Victor Canel España	Jorge Armas
1993	René Ortiz
1994	Anton Dario Villatoro
1995	Gonzalo Santos
1996	Gustavo Carillo
1997	Alberto Firmin Mendez
1998	Amilcar Gramajo
1999	Fernando Wilfredo Escobar
2000	Miguel Angel Perez
2001	Fernando Escobar
2002	Nery Velásquez
2003	Nery Velásquez
2004	Nery Velásquez	Abel Jochola	Lizandro Roberto Ajcú
2005	Johnny Morales Aquino
2006	Gerson Pérez	Juan Alvarado	Carlos Gabriel Hernández
2007	Nery Velásquez	Edgar Och Orozco	Carlos Gabriel Hernández
2008	José Zeceña	Rodrigo Castillo Calderon	Mario Archila
2009	Rolando Soloman	Mario Pichiya	Asbel Rodas Ochoa
2010	Edgar Hoch	Miguel Muñoz Yac	Carlos Magzul
2011	Julián Yac	Luis Marroquín	Walter Escobar
2012	Mario Archila	Alder Torres	Danny Morales
2013	Julián Yac	Alfredo Ajpacajá	Nervin Jiatz
2014	Nervin Jiatz	Luis Marroquín	Julián Yac
2015	Manuel Rodas	Luis Marroquín	Julián Yac
2016	Manuel Rodas	Julián Yac	Nervin Jiatz
2017	Walter Escobar	Manuel Rodas	Santos Ajpacajá
2018	Mardoqueo Vásquez	Nervin Jiatz	Alfredo Ajpacajá
2019	Mardoqueo Vásquez	Alex Julajuj	Manuel Rodas
2020	Race not held due to the COVID-19 pandemic in Guatemala
2021	Alex Julajuj	Sergio Chumil	Fredy Toc
2022	Mardoqueo Vásquez	Pedro Pablo Morales	Celso Ajpacajá
2023	Adolfo Vásquez	Mardoqueo Vásquez	Francisco Gonzales
2024	Sergio Chumil	Dorian Monterroso	Rony Julajuj

==== Under-23 ====
Year	Winner	Second	Third
2014	Marvin Soloman	Celso Ajpacajá	Brayan Rios
2015	Gerson Toc	Celso Ajpacajá	Mardoqueo Vásquez
2016	Gerson Toc	Celso Ajpacajá	Esdras Morales
2017	Mardoqueo Vásquez	Amílcar Méndez	Esdras Morales
2018	Ervin Pérez	Walter Pérez	Sergio Chumil
2019	Brayan Sacor	Edwin Sam	Bernardo Aguilar
2020	Race not held due to the COVID-19 pandemic in Guatemala
2021	Sergio Chumil	Víctor Alfonso Tuiz	Ervin Pérez
2022	Sabino Ajpacajá	Wilson Chonay	Edwin Sam
2023	Sabino Ajpacajá	Bryan Sacor	Wilson Chonay

=== Time trial ===
Year	Winner	Second	Third
1996	Sergio Godoy
2009	Rodrigo Castillo	Johnny Morales	Miguel Pérez
2010	Manuel Rodas	Johnny Morales	Danny Morales
2011	Luis Santizo	Manuel Rodas	Danny Morales
2012	Manuel Rodas	Lizandro Ajcú	Alder Torres
2013	Manuel Rodas	Alder Torres	Luis Santizo
2014	Manuel Rodas	Luis Santizo	Alder Torres
2015	Manuel Rodas	Alder Torres	Darwin Tejada
2016	Manuel Rodas	Walter Escobar	Ángel Carranza
2017	Manuel Rodas	Alder Torres	Brayan Ríos
2018	Manuel Rodas	Dorian Monterroso	Walter Escobar
2019	Manuel Rodas	Brayan Ríos	Dorian Monterroso
2020	Race not held due to the COVID-19 pandemic in Guatemala
2021	Manuel Rodas	Fredy Toc	Gerson Toc
2022	Manuel Rodas	Mardoqueo Vásquez	Julio Padilla
2023	Manuel Rodas	Henry Sam	Brayan Ríos
2024	Manuel Rodas	Sergio Chumil	Melvin Boron

==== Under-23 ====
Year	Winner	Second	Third
2015	Dorian Monterroso	Angel Carranza	Celso Ajpacaja
2016	Angel Carranza	Celso Ajpacaja	Andre Bos
2017	Orlando Toc	Dilson Orozco	Edgar Torres
2018	Henry Sam	Orlando Toc	Melvin Borón
2019	Edgar Torres	Henry Sam	José Canastuj
2020	Race not held due to the COVID-19 pandemic in Guatemala
2021	Sergio Chumil	Henry Sam	Edwin Sam
2022	Elí Sisimith	Edwin Sam	Fredy Bulux
2023	Sabino Ajpacajá	Dario Rabinal	Fredy Bulux
2024	Dario Rabinal	Diego Azaños	Gérman Rabinal

== Women ==
Year	Road Race	Time Trial
2010	Maria Angulo	Sindy Morales
2011	Florinda Isabel de Leon	Maria Angulo
2012		
2013	Cynthia Lee Lopez	Andrea Guillen
2014	Cynthia Lee Lopez	Cynthia Lee Lopez
2015	Gabriela Soto	Andrea Guillen
2016	Cynthia Lee Lopez	Andrea Guillen
2017	Nicolle Bruderer	Nicolle Bruderer
2018	Gabriela Soto	Nicolle Bruderer
2019	Gabriela Soto	Paula Guillen
2020	Races not held due to the COVID-19 pandemic in Guatemala	
2021	Gabriela Soto	Gabriela Soto
2022	Gabriela Soto	Gabriela Soto
2023	Gabriela Soto	Gabriela Soto
2024	Gabriela Soto	Gabriela Soto
