= Santa Apolonia =

Santa Apolonia and Santa Apolónia are the Spanish and Portuguese spellings of Saint Apollonia.

It is also used as a place name:

- Santa Apolonia, Chimaltenango, Guatemala
- Santa Apolonia, Matanzas, Cuba
- Santa Apolonia Hills, Peru
- Santa Apolónia Station, a major railway and metro station in Lisbon, Portugal
- Santa Apolonia, Trujillo, Venezuela
- A former name of Réunion Island given by Portuguese Explorers in the 16th Century, now part of France
