= Christofer Jurado =

Panamanian cyclist

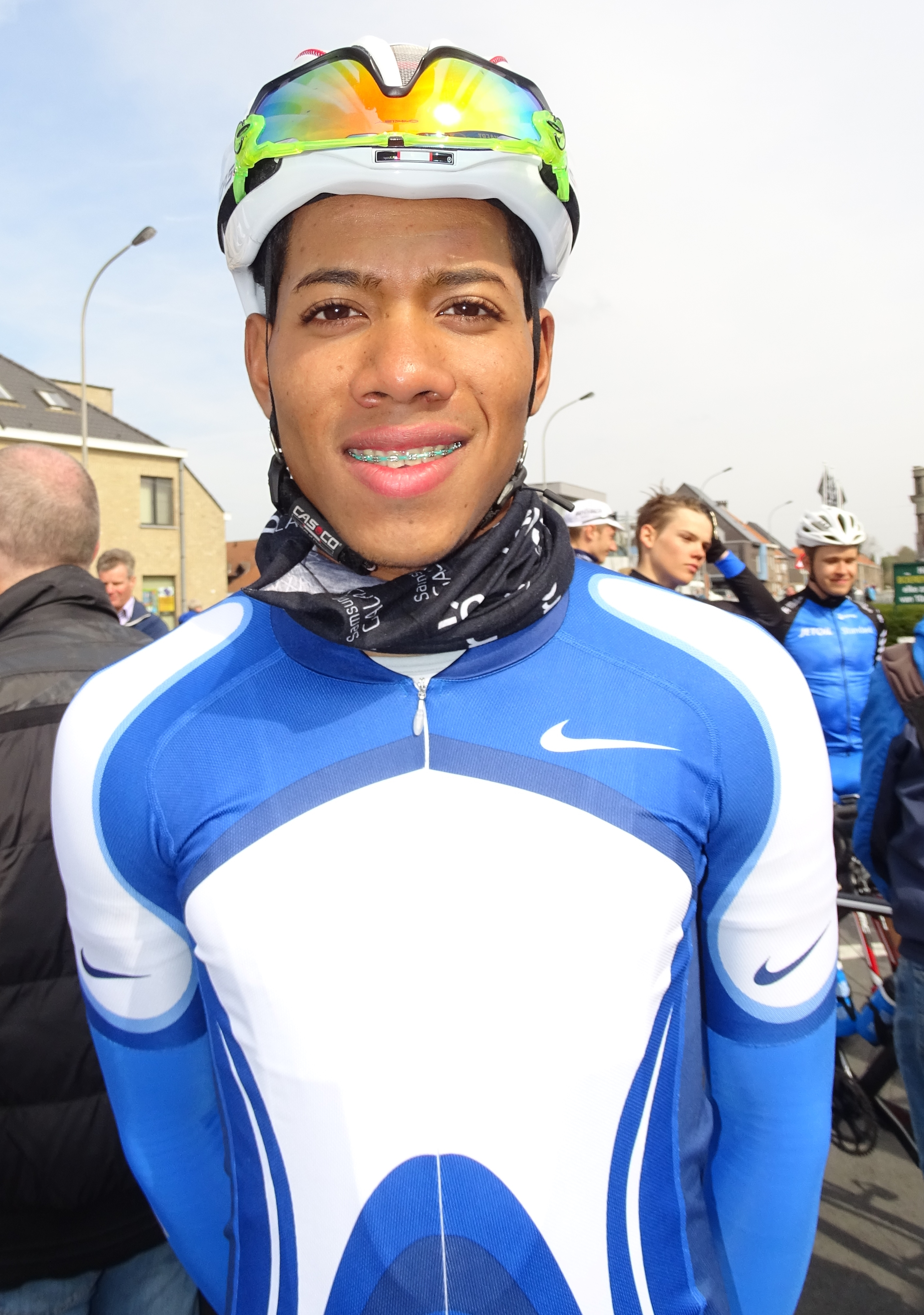
- Jurado in 2016

Personal information
- Full name: Christofer Robín Jurado López
- Born: 27 October 1995 (age 30) Panama City, Panama
- Height: 1.76 m (5 ft 9 in)
- Weight: 58 kg (128 lb)

Cycling career
- Sport: Cycling
- Current team: Panamá es Cultura y Valores
- Discipline: Road
- Role: Rider

Amateur teams
- 2013: Bathco
- 2014–2016: World Cycling Centre
- 2017: Quick Step–Telco'm–Gimex
- 2019: Aeronaval–Mapiex

Professional teams
- 2018: Trevigiani Phonix–Hemus 1896
- 2019–2020: Terengganu Inc. TSG
- 2021–: Panamá es Cultura y Valores

Major wins
- One-day races and classics National Road Race Championships (2017, 2018, 2020) National Time Trial Championships (2019-2021)

Christofer Robín Jurado López (born 27 October 1995) is a Panamanian cyclist, who currently rides for UCI Continental team Panamá es Cultura y Valores.

== Major results ==
2017
National Road Championships

1st Road race
1st Under-23 road race
2nd Under-23 time trial
3rd Time trial

2018
National Road Championships

1st Road race
5th Time trial

1st Mountains classification Tour of China II
Central American and Caribbean Games

2nd Road race
6th Time trial

2019
National Road Championships

1st Time trial
2nd Road race

1st Stage 5 Vuelta Independencia Nacional
Central American Road Championships

2nd Time trial
9th Road race

Pan American Games

4th Road race
5th Time trial

6th Overall Tour of Quanzhou Bay
8th Road race, Pan American Road Championships
2020
1st Time trial, Central American Road Championships
National Road Championships

1st Road race
1st Time trial

Vuelta a Guatemala

1st Stages 4 (ITT) & 10

2021
National Road Championships

1st Time trial
2nd Road Race

Central American Road Championships

1st Road race
2nd Time trial

1st Germenica Grand Prix Road Race
Pan American Road Championships

5th Time trial
7th Road race

5th Grand Prix Kayseri
2022
2nd Time trial, National Road Championships
3rd Time trial, Bolivarian Games
Central American Road Championships

3rd Time trial
8th Road race

7th Overall Vuelta a Formosa Internacional
8th Grand Prix Velo Alanya
2023
Central American Road Championships

1st Road race
1st Time trial

4th Time trial, National Road Championships
