= Nicolle Bruderer =

Guatemalan cyclist

Personal information
- Full name: Nicolle Marie Bruderer Cofiño
- Born: 15 August 1993 (age 33) Guatemala City, Guatemala

Cycling career
- Sport: Cycling
- Disciplines: Road; Track
- Role: Rider
- Rider type: All-rounder

Amateur team
- 2015–2016: ISCorp–SmartChoice

Professional team
- 2017–2020: Tibco–Silicon Valley Bank

Nicolle Marie Bruderer Cofiño (born 15 August 1993) is a Guatemalan professional racing cyclist, who most recently rode for UCI Women's Continental Team Tibco–Silicon Valley Bank.

== Career ==
A keen participant in multiple sports in her childhood, she took up cycle racing after trying track cycling with the encouragement of her father in her senior year of high school. She then became a student at the University of Colorado Boulder, combining undergraduate studies in Business Management with competing for the University in road cycling, as well as representing her country on the track during the last two years of her course. She competed for Guatemala at the 2015 Pan American Games.

She rode in the women's road race at the 2016 UCI Road World Championships, finishing in 38th place. In November 2016, she was named as a member of the Tibco–Silicon Valley Bank team for the 2017 season. She became Guatemalan national champion for the road race and time trial in 2017, and successfully defended her time trial title the following year.

== Major results ==
2011
1st Time trial, National Junior Road Championships
2012
8th Overall Vuelta Femenina a Guatemala
2013
3rd Scratch, Bolivarian Games
2014
Copa Guatemala de Ciclismo de Pista

1st Individual pursuit
1st Omnium

2015
3rd Overall Tulsa Tough
8th Overall Tour of America's Dairyland
2017
National Road Championships

1st Road race
1st Time trial

2018
National Road Championships

1st Time trial
2nd Road race

Central American and Caribbean Games

8th Road race
8th Time trial

10th Overall Armed Forces Association Cycling Classic
