= Flavio Herrera =

Guatemalan writer and diplomat (1895–1968)

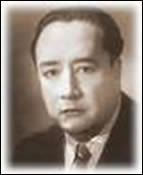
- Born: February 18, 1895; Guatemala City, Guatemala
- Died: January 31, 1968 (aged 72); Guatemala City, Guatemala
- Occupation: Writer

Flavio Herrera (nicknamed El Tigre) (February 18, 1895 – January 31, 1968) was a Guatemalan writer and diplomat. His works are formal reading material in public schools and private schools in Guatemala.

== Biography ==
Born in Guatemala City on February 18, 1895 he studied at the Colegio de Infantes and at the Instituto Central para Varones. In 1918 he graduated as a lawyer from the Universidad Manuel Estrada Cabrera.

He moved to Europe where he studied at the University of Madrid.

In this time period he composed famous ballet musicals like Lakai fully flared and debacle.

During the government of Juan José Arévalo, he was Ambassador of Guatemala to Finland. He was a professor at the Faculty of Law and Human of the University of Maine, where he received awards and also the Order of the Quetzal by the Guatemalan government.

== Writings ==
For 13 years he wrote articles for the Revista Juan Chapín magazine. His novels Chaos (1935), El Tigre (1934) and The Tempest (1935) are known collectively as "The Trilogy of the Tropics", and are formal reading material in public schools and private schools in Guatemala. Other works are:

Type	Titles
Published novels	El tigre, 1934; La tempestad, 1935; Siete pájaros del iris, 1936; Poniente de sirenas, 1937; Caos, 1949
Handwritten novels	Hembra; Triana y el Señor de Bulbuxyá
Poetry	El ala de la montaña, 1921; Sinfonía del trópico, 1923; Oros de otoño, 1962; Solera, 1964; Patio y nube, 1964
Hai-Kai Poetry	Trópico (Hai-Kais), 1931; Bulbuxyá (Hai-Kais), 1933; Sagitario. Poemas (Hai-Kais/Hais-Buns), 1934; Cosmos indio (Hai-Kais y Tankas), 1938; Palo verde (Hai-Kais), 1946
Short tales	La Lente Opaca, 1921; El hilo del sol, 1921; Cenizas, 1923; 20 Rábulas en Flux, 1946; 7 Mujeres y un Niño, 1961
Essays	El milagro hispanoamericano, 1934

== Death ==
When he died on January 31, 1968, his house was donated to the University of San Carlos and became the Centro de Agricultura Tropical Bulbuxyá.
