= Manuel Rodas =

Guatemalan cyclist (born 1984)

Personal information
- Full name: Manuel Oseas Rodas Ochoa
- Born: 5 July 1984 (age 42) La Esperanza, Quetzaltenango, Guatemala
- Height: 1.72 m (5 ft 8 in)
- Weight: 68 kg (150 lb)

Cycling career
- Sport: Cycling
- Current team: Decorabaños–AC Quetzaltenango
- Disciplines: Road; Track
- Role: Rider
- Rider type: Time trialist

Amateur teams
- 2003–2004: Hino Xela
- 2005–: Cable DX–Decorabaños
Medal record
Men's road bicycle racing
Representing Guatemala
Pan American Championships
| Silver medal – second place | 2015 León | Time trial |
| Bronze medal – third place | 2017 Santo Domingo | Time trial |
| Bronze medal – third place | 2018 San Juan | Time trial |

Manuel Oseas Rodas Ochoa (born 5 July 1984) is a Guatemalan cyclist that represented Guatemala at the Olympics in road cycling in 2012, 2016 and 2020.

== Major results ==
2005
3rd Overall Vuelta a El Salvador
2006
1st Stage 11 Vuelta a Guatemala
7th Time trial, Central American and Caribbean Games
2007
1st Stage 11 Vuelta a Guatemala
2008
1st Stage 11 Vuelta Ciclista a Costa Rica
5th Overall Vuelta a Guatemala
6th Overall Vuelta al Ecuador
2009
10th Overall Vuelta a Guatemala

1st Stage 9

2010
1st Time trial, National Road Championships
2012
1st Time trial, National Road Championships
1st Stage 8 Vuelta a Guatemala
2013
Central American Games

1st Time trial
2nd Road race

1st Time trial, National Road Championships
1st Stage 2 Ruta del Centro
3rd Points race, Pan American Track Championships
2014
1st Time trial, National Road Championships
Central American and Caribbean Games

3rd Road race
4th Time trial

2015
National Road Championships

1st Road race
1st Time trial

Pan American Road Championships

2nd Time trial
6th Road race

3rd Overall Vuelta a Guatemala

1st Stage 1 (ITT)

5th Time trial, Pan American Games
2016
National Road Championships

1st Road race
1st Time trial

2nd Points race, Pan American Track Championships
2nd Overall Vuelta a Guatemala

1st Stage 4 (ITT)

7th Time trial, Pan American Road Championships
2017
National Road Championships

1st Time trial
2nd Road race

1st Overall Vuelta a Guatemala

1st Stages 3b (TTT) & 6 (ITT)

3rd Time trial, Pan American Road Championships
2018
1st Time trial, National Road Championships
2nd Overall Vuelta a Guatemala

1st Stage 5 (ITT)

3rd Time trial, Pan American Road Championships
4th Time trial, Central American and Caribbean Games
2019
National Road Championships

1st Time trial
3rd Road race

1st Overall Vuelta a Guatemala

1st Stage 5 (ITT)

7th Time trial, Pan American Road Championships
Pan American Games

8th Road race
9th Time trial

2020
1st Stage 9 Vuelta a Guatemala
3rd Time trial, Central American Road Championships
2021
1st Time trial, National Road Championships
Central American Road Championships

3rd Time trial
7th Road race

4th Time trial, Pan American Road Championships
2022
1st Time trial, National Road Championships
5th Time trial, Pan American Road Championships
2023
1st Time trial, National Road Championships
2nd Time trial, Central American Road Championships
2024
National Road Championships

1st Time trial
5th Road race

Central American Road Championships

2nd Team time trial
5th Time trial
