= Yelko Gómez =

Panamanian bicycle racer

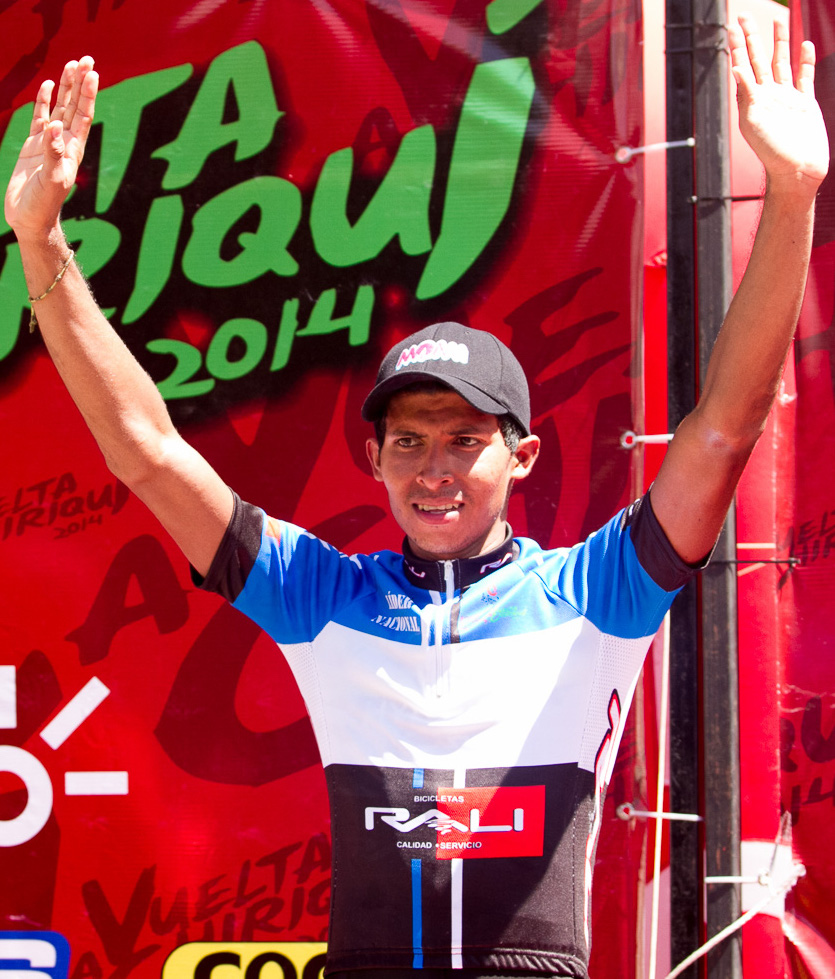
- Gómez in 2014

Personal information
- Full name: Yelko Marino Gómez Valdés
- Born: March 9, 1989 (age 37) Chiriquí Province, Panama

Cycling career
- Sport: Cycling
- Discipline: Road
- Role: Rider

Amateur teams
- 2014: Wilier Panama
- 2015: Hyundai–Momi–Continental
- 2016: Arroz Sonora–Dimonex
- 2017–2020: Ininco
- 2021: Aeronaval–Mapiex

Professional teams
- 2012–2013: Caja Rural
- 2022–2024: Panamá es Cultura y Valores

Yelko Marino Gómez Valdés (born March 9, 1989, in Chiriquí Province) is a Panamanian cyclist, who last rode for UCI Continental team Panamá es Cultura y Valores.

== Major results ==
2008
2nd Road race, National Under-23 Road Championships
2011
1st Memorial Avelino Camacho
2nd Vuelta a Navarra
2012
1st Stage 3 Vuelta a Castilla y León
2014
1st Time trial, National Road Championships
7th Overall Vuelta Ciclista a Costa Rica
2015
1st Time trial, National Road Championships
2018
2nd Time trial, National Road Championships
2021
3rd Road race, Central American Road Championships
