= Panamá es Cultura y Valores =

Panamanian cycling team

Team information
- UCI code: PCV
- Registered: Panama
- Founded: 2021
- Discipline: Road
- Status: UCI Continental
- Bicycles: Wilier Triestina

Key personnel
- General manager: Emer Samudio Romero
- Team manager: Juan Pablo Villegas

Team name history
- 2021–: Panamá es Cultura y Valores

Panamá es Cultura y Valores is a Panamanian UCI Continental road cycling team founded in 2021.

== Team roster ==
As of 6 February 2024.

Rider	Date of birth
Franklin Archibold (PAN)	24 August 1997 (age 29)
Hassan Felipe Chan (PAN)	5 January 2005 (age 21)
Bolívar Espinoza (PAN)	8 December 1996 (age 29)
Yelko Gómez (PAN)	9 March 1989 (age 37)
Sandi Guerra (PAN)	17 June 1996 (age 30)
Nolberto Hernández (PAN)	27 March 1996 (age 30)

Rider	Date of birth
Roberto José Herrera (PAN)	8 September 2001 (age 24)
Christofer Jurado (PAN)	27 October 1995 (age 30)
Randish Lorenzo (PAN)	24 May 1997 (age 29)
Bredio Ruiz (PAN)	25 July 2001 (age 25)
Alex Strah (PAN)	26 March 1996 (age 30)
Cristopher Vargas (PAN)	30 August 2003 (age 23)
