= Mardoqueo Vásquez =

Guatemalan cyclist

Personal information
- Full name: Juan Mardoqueo Vásquez Vásquez
- Born: 19 June 1995 (age 31) Totonicapán, Guatemala

Cycling career
- Sport: Cycling
- Current team: Hino–One–La Red
- Discipline: Road
- Role: Rider

Amateur teams
- 2015–2019: Cuajo Luna Universal Foods
- 2020–: Hino–One–La Red–Tigo–Eurobikes

Major wins
- One-day races and Classics National Road Race Championships (2018, 2019, 2022)

Juan Mardoqueo Vásquez Vásquez (born 19 June 1995) is a Guatemalan racing cyclist who currently rides for the Hino–One–La Red team.

== Major results ==
2015
3rd Road race, National Under–23 Road Championships
2016
1st Overall Vuelta de la Juventud Guatemala

1st Stage 2

2017
1st Overall Vuelta al Altiplano Marquense

1st Stage 3

5th Road race, National Road Championships
2018
National Road Championships

1st Road race
6th Time trial

10th Overall Vuelta a Guatemala
2019
National Road Championships

1st Road race
6th Time trial

3rd Overall Vuelta a Guatemala

1st Stage 8

2020
1st Overall Vuelta a Guatemala

1st Guatemalan rider classification
1st Stages 5 & 7

1st Stage 2 Vuelta a Chiriquí
2022
National Road Championships

1st Road race
2nd Time trial

1st Overall Vuelta a Guatemala

1st Stages 4 & 6

2023
2nd Road race, National Road Championships
6th Overall Vuelta a Guatemala

1st Stage 6

2024
8th Overall Vuelta Bantrab
2nd Vuelta a Guatemala
2025
2nd Overall Vuelta Bantrab
