= Centro de Agricultura Tropical Bulbuxyá =

Guatemalan coffee estate

Coordinates: 14.5007°N 91.3617°W

The Centro de Agricultura Tropical Bulbuxyá is an old coffee estate in Guatemala in which there is an Arboretum, in which the land is devoted to agroforestry research. The centre depends on the University of San Carlos of Guatemala and the National Council of Protected Areas (CONAP).

The property is located in the municipality of San Miguel Panán, near San Antonio Suchitepéquez, Suchitepéquez Department, Guatemala.

== History ==
The estate belonged to the Guatemalan writer Flavio Herrera, nicknamed "The Tiger" (the name of his 1934 novel). When he died on January 31, 1968, he donated his house and farm assets to the University of San Carlos of Guatemala for agricultural research.

The Arboretum contains over 100 native and exotic plants.
