= Juan Pablo Villegas =

Colombian cyclist

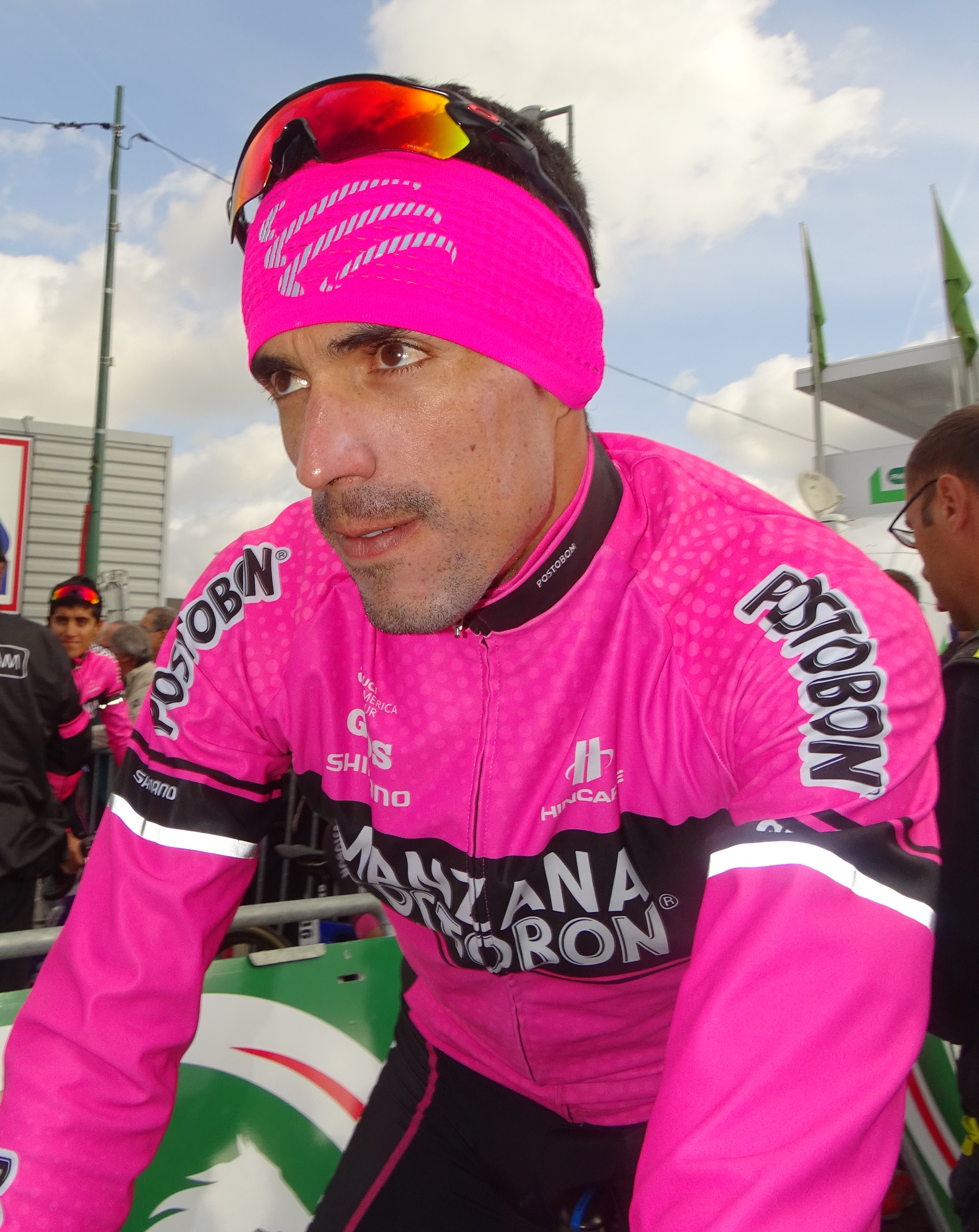
- Villegas in 2017.

Personal information
- Full name: Juan Pablo Villegas Cardona
- Born: 15 October 1987 (age 39) Pácora, Caldas, Colombia
- Height: 1.78 m (5 ft 10 in)
- Weight: 73 kg (161 lb)

Cycling career
- Sport: Cycling
- Current team: Panamá es Cultura y Valores
- Discipline: Road
- Role: Rider (retired); Directeur sportif

Amateur teams
- 2010: GW–Shimano
- 2012: Colombia es Pasión–Café de Colombia
- 2015: Team Manzana Postobón

Professional teams
- 2011: Colombia es Pasión–Café de Colombia
- 2013–2014: 4-72 Colombia
- 2015: Team SmartStop
- 2016–2018: Team Manzana Postobón

Managerial team
- 2021–: Panamá es Cultura y Valores
Medal record
Men's road bicycle racing
Representing Colombia
Pan American Championships
Silver medal – second place	2009 Hidalgo	Road race

Juan Pablo Villegas Cardona (born 15 October 1987 in Pácora, Caldas) is a Colombian former professional cyclist, who rode professionally in 2011 and from 2013 to 2018, for Team SmartStop and Team Manzana Postobón. He currently works as a directeur sportif for UCI Continental team Panamá es Cultura y Valores.

== Major results ==
2012
Vuelta a Venezuela

1st Stages 6 & 9

2014
1st Overall Vuelta Mexico Telmex

1st Stages 1, 4 & 5 (ITT)

2017
1st Stage 12 Vuelta a Colombia
