= Roberto González (cyclist) =

Panamanian cyclist (born 1994)

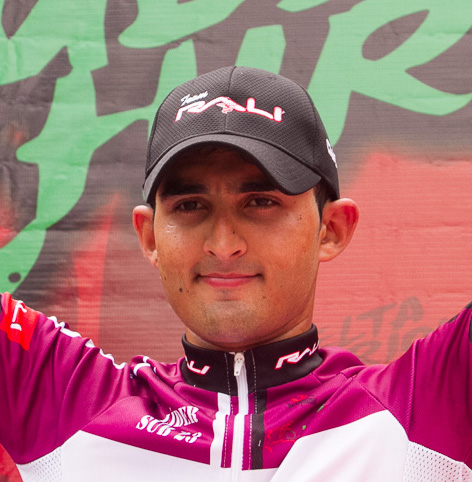
- González in 2014

Personal information
- Full name: Roberto Carlos González Castellero
- Born: 21 May 1994 (age 32) Panama

Cycling career
- Sport: Cycling
- Current team: Solution Tech NIPPO Rali
- Discipline: Road
- Role: Rider

Amateur teams
- 2013–2015: Rali–Claro
- 2016: EPM–UNE–Área Metropolitana
- 2018: Rali–Claro
- 2024: Rali–Giant

Professional teams
- 2017: Bicicletas Strongman
- 2019–2021: Neri Sottoli–Selle Italia–KTM
- 2022–2023: Java Kiwi Atlántico
- 2023: MG.K Vis Colors for Peace
- 2024–: Team Corratec–Vini Fantini

Major wins
- One-day races and classics National Road Race Championships (2025)

Roberto Carlos González Castellero (born 21 May 1994) is a Panamanian cyclist, who currently rides for UCI ProTeam Solution Tech NIPPO Rali.

== Major results ==
2013
6th Time trial, National Road Championships
2014
National Road Championships

2nd Time trial
3rd Road race

2015
2nd Time trial, National Road Championships
2017
National Road Championships

9th Road race
10th Time trial

2018
National Road Championships

2nd Road race
6th Time trial

2019
9th Overall Tour of Albania
2020
Vuelta a Guatemala

1st Stages 2 & 3

4th Road race, Central American Road Championships
National Road Championships

4th Road race
5th Time trial

2022
4th Road race, Central American Road Championships
National Road Championships

4th Time trial
8th Road race

2023
9th Overall Giro della Regione Friuli Venezia Giulia
2024
8th GP Kranj
2025
National Road Championships

1st Road race
3rd Time trial

2026
1st Mountains classification, Giro di Sardegna
