= Carlos Samudio =

Panamanian cyclist (born 1997)

Personal information
- Full name: Carlos Ariel Samudio Carrera
- Born: 5 October 1997 (age 29) David, Chiriquí, Panama

Cycling career
- Sport: Cycling
- Current team: Solution Tech NIPPO Rali
- Discipline: Road
- Role: Rider

Amateur team
- 2024: Rali - Giant

Professional teams
- 2023–2024: MG.K Vis Colors for Peace
- 2024–: Team Corratec–Vini Fantini

Major wins
- One-day races and classics National Time Trial Championships (2025)

Carlos Ariel Samudio Carrera (born 5 October 1997) is a Panamanian cyclist, who currently rides for Solution Tech NIPPO Rali.

== Major results ==
2014
National Junior Road Championships

1st Road race
1st Time trial

2016
5th Time trial, National Road Championships
2017
5th Road race, National Road Championships
2018
National Road Championships

3rd Time trial
5th Road race

2019
1st Time trial, National Under-23 Road Championships
10th Time trial, Pan American Under–23 Road Championships
2022
5th Road race, National Road Championships
2023
2nd Overall Tour de Panamá
2024
4th Time trial, National Road Championships
10th Overall Tour de Kyushu
2025
National Road Championships

1st Time trial
2nd Road race
