= Ramón Carretero =

Panamanian cyclist (born 1990)

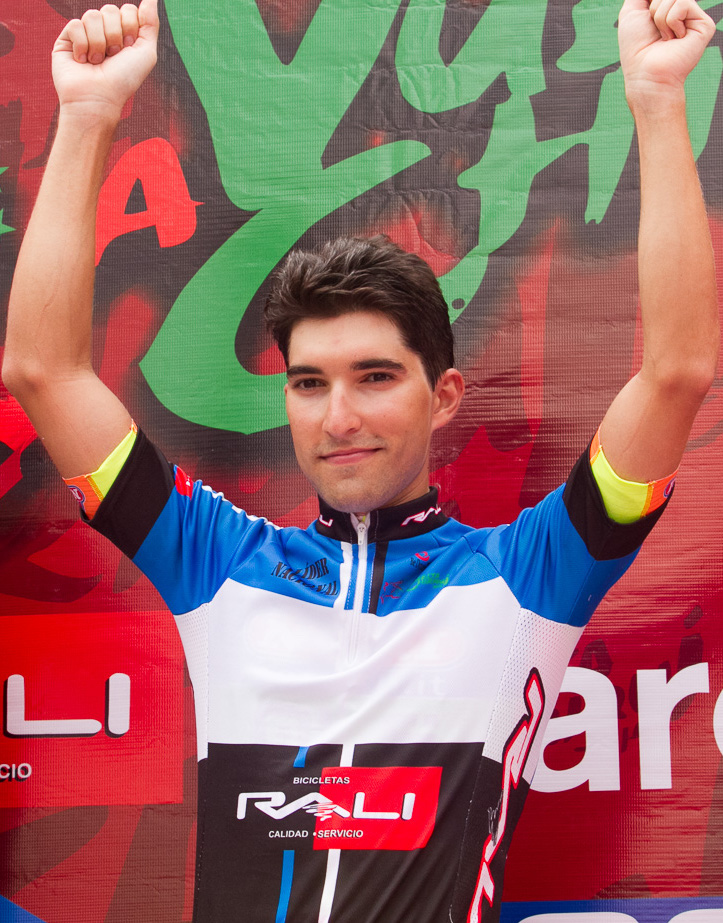
- Carretero in 2014

Personal information
- Full name: Ramón Carretero Marciags
- Born: 26 November 1990 (age 35)

Cycling career
- Sport: Cycling
- Current team: Suspended
- Discipline: Road
- Role: Rider

Professional teams
- 2012: Movistar Continental Team
- 2013–2015: Vini Fantini–Selle Italia

Major wins
- National Time Trial Championships (2011–2012)

Ramón Carretero Marciags (born 26 November 1990) is a Panamanian racing cyclist,

== Major results ==
2009
1st Tanara — Puente de BayanoPanama
1st Under-23 National Time Trial Championships
1st Overall Tour Ciclístico de Panamá

1st Stages 1 & 5

2010
1st Under-23 Juegos Centroamericanos Time Trial Championships
3rd Juegos Centroamericanos Time Trial Championships
1st Overall Tour Ciclístico de Panamá

1st Stages 1 (TTT), 5 & 6

1st Stage 6 (TTT) Vuelta a Chiriquí
2011
1st Pan American Under-23 Time Trial Championships
1st National Under-23 Time Trial Championships
1st National Time Trial Championships
1st Stage 1 (TTT) Tour Ciclístico de Panamá
1st Overall Tour Ciclístico de Panamá

1st Stage 5

1st Overall Vuelta a Chiriquí

1st Stages 1, 4 (TTT) & 10

2012
1st National Time Trial Championships
1st Overall Tour Ciclístico de Panamá

1st Stages 1 (TTT), 3, 4 & 5

2013
3rd National Time Trial Championships
5th Overall Vuelta a Chiriquí
