= Esquipulas Palo Gordo =

- Municipality
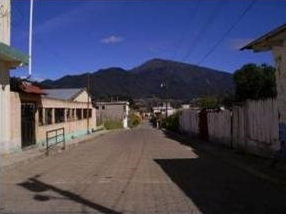

- Location in Guatemala
- Coordinates: 14°56′31″N 91°49′33″W
- Country: Guatemala
- Department: San Marcos

Government
  - Mayor (2012-2020): Juan Carlos Ochoa (PP)

Area
  - Municipality: 45 km^{2} (17 sq mi)

Population (2018 census)
  - Municipality: 12,892
  - Density: 290/km^{2} (740/sq mi)
  - Urban: 3,952
- Climate: Cwb

Esquipulas Palo Gordo (Spanish pronunciation: [eskiˈpulas ˈpalo ˈɣoɾðo]) is a town and municipality in the San Marcos department of Guatemala. The town was founded on 24 December 1826 year. In the 1920s it was merged with San Marcos, but in 1948 it recovered its autonomy again.

== Political division ==
Esquipulas Palo Gordo political division
Location	Name	Brief description
Town	Esquipulas Palo Gordo	
Villages	Tánil	Located by Ixtágel hill.
Villages	Fraternidad	Formerly "Hoyón Grande" and "Hoyón Chiquito".
Villages	Carrizal	Previously known as "San Francisco" (1917).
Villages	Villa Hermosa	Founded in 1902.
Villages	Ojo de Agua	Its name is due to the presence of several water creeks in the area.
Villages	Pojopón	Also known as Santa Cruz Pojopón.
Cantón	Bethania	Previously known as «Cumbre de Paltazá» settlement, since it was right by Paltazá creek.
Settlements	El Paraíso	Previously called «Ixquihuila».
Settlements	Jerusalén	One of Tánil village newest settlements.
Settlements	Villa Nueva	Created when all the community came together and decided to settle in a new location.
Settlements	San Isidro	
Settlements	Primavera	
Settlements	Buena Vista	
Settlements	Esmeralda	
Settlements	Caserío Puente de Tierra	
Settlements	Tierra Blanca	

== Natural resources ==
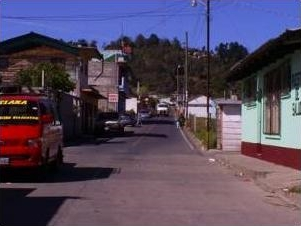
Esquipulas Palo Gordo in 2009.

Natural resources in the municipality are mainly cattle, forestry and agriculture. The main agricultural products are: sugar cane, corn, wheat, potato, and beans; the land is flat and fertile.

== Tourism ==
Esquipulas Palo Gordo has several natural attractions; among them is Ixtagel hill and the Quetzal refuge in Fraternidad village, along with a large forest area that covers approximately 50% of the municipal area and has extensive fauna variety.

The municipality celebrates its annual fair in honor of the Black Christ of Esquipulas between January 12 and 17.

== Politics ==
In 2011, a woman joined the mayoral race in Esquipulas Palo Gordo for the very first time, when Edilma Marleny Ochoa Barrios ran for Unión del Cambio Nacional —UCN—.

== Climate ==
Esquipulas Palo Gordo has temperate climate (Köppen:Cwb).

Climate data for Esquipulas Palo Gordo
Month	Jan	Feb	Mar	Apr	May	Jun	Jul	Aug	Sep	Oct	Nov	Dec	Year
Mean daily maximum °C (°F)	16.7 (62.1)	17.1 (62.8)	18.6 (65.5)	19.5 (67.1)	19.4 (66.9)	18.7 (65.7)	18.6 (65.5)	19.1 (66.4)	18.6 (65.5)	17.8 (64.0)	17.5 (63.5)	17.0 (62.6)	18.2 (64.8)
Daily mean °C (°F)	9.2 (48.6)	9.5 (49.1)	11.0 (51.8)	12.5 (54.5)	13.7 (56.7)	13.8 (56.8)	13.6 (56.5)	13.5 (56.3)	13.7 (56.7)	12.8 (55.0)	11.2 (52.2)	10.2 (50.4)	12.1 (53.7)
Mean daily minimum °C (°F)	1.8 (35.2)	2.0 (35.6)	3.4 (38.1)	5.5 (41.9)	8.1 (46.6)	9.0 (48.2)	8.7 (47.7)	7.9 (46.2)	8.8 (47.8)	7.8 (46.0)	4.9 (40.8)	3.5 (38.3)	6.0 (42.7)
Average precipitation mm (inches)	6 (0.2)	6 (0.2)	25 (1.0)	66 (2.6)	227 (8.9)	329 (13.0)	237 (9.3)	269 (10.6)	342 (13.5)	227 (8.9)	28 (1.1)	13 (0.5)	1,775 (69.8)
Source: Climate-Data.org

== Geographic location ==
Esquipulas Palo Gordo can be reached two ways:

- From Guatemala City to San Marcos: Ruta Interamericana, 252 km highway
- From San Marcos: 7.5 km national route

It is surrounded by San Marcos Department municipalities:

== See also ==
- La Aurora International Airport
- Tapachula International Airport
