= Cerro El Baúl =

National park in Guatemala

Cerro El Baúl National Park
- Interactive map of Cerro El Baúl; National Park
- Location: Quetzaltenango (department), Guatemala
- Coordinates: 14°49′52″N 91°30′10″W
- Area: 2.40 km^{2} (0.93 sq mi)
- Elevation: 2,650 m (8,690 ft)
- Established: Acuerdo Gubernativo 26-05-55
- Operator: Municipality of Quetzaltenango

Cerro El Baúl, also known as El Baúl, is a forested lava dome overlooking the valley of Quetzaltenango. It is located about 3 km north of the Almolonga volcano, at the south-eastern edge of the city of Quetzaltenango in Guatemala. And is one of the city's last remaining green areas.

Cerro El Baúl covers an area of 2.40 km^{2} and was declared a national park in 1955. The park is under serious threat due to illicit extraction of trees and advancing urbanization crossing the park borders.

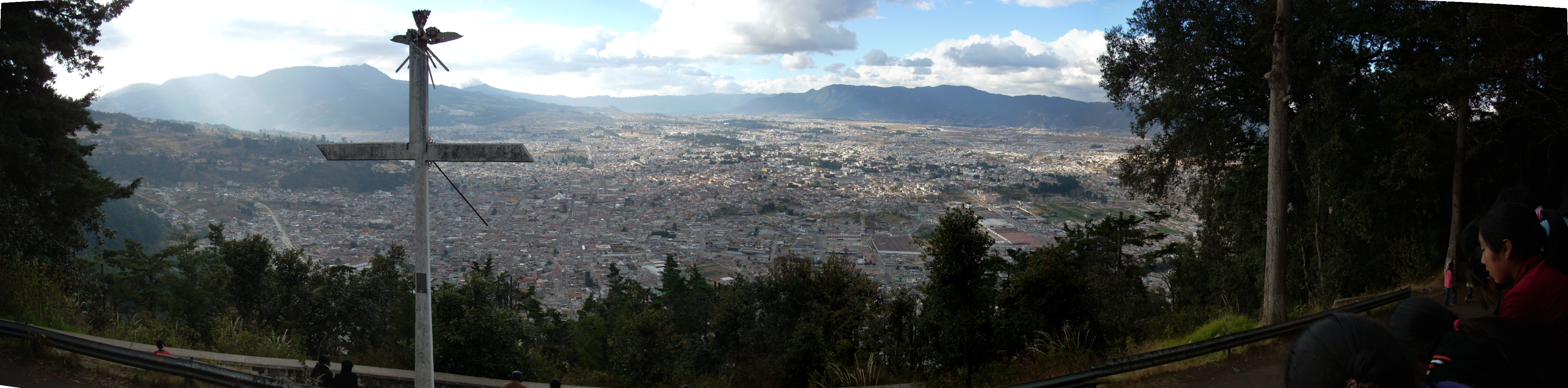
A view of Quetzaltenango city from Cerro El Baúl.
