= Gabriela Soto =

Guatemalan cyclist

Personal information
- Full name: Jasmin Gabriela Soto López
- Born: 11 January 1993 (age 33)

Cycling career
- Sport: Cycling
- Current team: Liro Sport
- Discipline: Road
- Role: Rider

Amateur teams
- 2021: Macizo–Cordelsa
- 2022–: Liro Sport

Professional team
- 2018–2019: Swapit–Agolíco

Jasmin Gabriela Soto López (born 11 January 1993) is a Guatemalan professional racing cyclist, who currently rides for Colombian amateur team Liro Sport.

== Major results ==
2014
2nd Road race, National Road Championships
2015
1st Road race, National Road Championships
2nd Overall Vuelta Femenina a Guatemala
2016
2nd Road race, National Road Championships
2017
National Road Championships

2nd Road race
2nd Time trial

2018
National Road Championships

1st Road race
2nd Time trial

3rd Overall Vuelta Femenina a Guatemala
10th Overall Vuelta Internacional Femenina a Costa Rica
2019
2nd Time trial, National Road Championships
4th Overall Vuelta Femenina a Guatemala
2021
National Road Championships

1st Road race
1st Time trial

6th Overall Vuelta Femenina a Guatemala
2022
National Road Championships

1st Road race
1st Time trial

2nd Overall Vuelta Internacional Femenina a Costa Rica
2023
National Road Championships

1st Road race
1st Time trial
