= Cuilapa-Barbarena =

Volcanic field in Guatemala

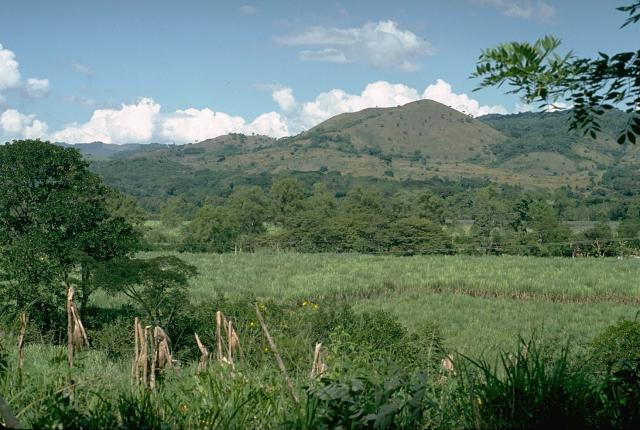

Highest point
- Elevation: 1,454 m (4,770 ft)
- Coordinates: 14°33′N 90°4′W

Geography
- Location within Guatemala
- Location: Guatemala

Geology
- Volcanic arc: Central America Volcanic Arc
- Last eruption: Unknown, possibly Holocene

The Cuilapa-Barbarena volcanic field is a field of cinder cones in Guatemala with approximately 70 cones. At an elevation of 1,454 m (4,770 ft), the field is located over the intersection of the local Jalpatagua fault with the Miocene Santa Rosa de Lima caldera. The youngest cones postdate the last activity phase of Tecuamburro and may be of Holocene age, but with no confirmed evidence.

== See also ==
- List of volcanoes in Guatemala
- List of volcanic fields
