= Michael Hyatt (table tennis) =

Jamaican table tennis player

Personal information
- Nationality: Jamaican
- Born: 9 April 1970 (age 56)

Sport
- Sport: Table tennis

Michael Hyatt (born 9 April 1970) is a Jamaican table tennis player. He competed at the 1992 Summer Olympics and the 1996 Summer Olympics.

He was nicknamed "the Usain Bolt of Table Tennis" in USA Table Tennis Magazine.

An article published by The New York Times in 2024 detailed several incidents of Hyatt conning people into investing in what he fraudulently claimed to be a ping pong business. Repeated attempts to contact him further, both by his previous romantic partners and by news agencies, have been unsuccessful.
