= Sergio Chumil =

Guatemalan road racing cyclist

Personal information
- Full name: Sergio Geovani Chumil González
- Born: 8 October 2000 (age 26) Tecpán, Guatemala
- Height: 1.67 m (5 ft 6 in)
- Weight: 62 kg (137 lb)

Cycling career
- Sport: Cycling
- Current team: Burgos Burpellet BH
- Discipline: Road
- Role: Rider
- Rider type: Climber

Amateur teams
- 2017–2019: AD Chimaltenango
- 2020–2021: Ejercito de Guatemala
- 2022–2023: Aluminios Cortizo

Professional team
- 2024–: Burgos BH

Major wins
- One-day races and Classics National Road Race Championships (2024) National Time Trial Championships (2025)

Sergio Geovani Chumil González (born 8 October 2000) is a Guatemalan cyclist, who currently rides for UCI ProTeam Burgos Burpellet BH.

== Major results ==
2017
1st Road race, National Junior Road Championships
2018
National Junior Road Championships

1st Time trial
3rd Road race

2020
7th Overall Vuelta al Ecuador
7th Overall Vuelta a Guatemala
2021
National Under-23 Road Championships

1st Road race
1st Time trial

2nd Road race, National Road Championships
6th Road race, Pan American Under-23 Road Championships
6th Road race, Central American Road Championships
9th Road race, Junior Pan American Games
2022
5th Overall Vuelta a Guatemala

1st Young rider classification

6th Road race, Central American Road Championships
2023
1st Overall Vuelta a Zamora

1st Stage 4

1st Stage 2 Vuelta a Navarra
3rd Overall Vuelta Bantrab
7th Overall Vuelta a Guatemala

1st Stages 4 & 5

2024 (2 pro wins)
National Road Championships

1st Road race
2nd Time trial

1st Stage 3 Volta a Portugal
Central American Road Championships

2nd Team time trial
6th Road race
6th Time trial

6th Overall Vuelta a Costa Rica
9th Road race, Pan American Road Championships
10th Clásica Terres de l'Ebre
2025 (2)
1st Time trial, National Road Championships
Central American Road Championships

2nd Road race
2nd Team time trial
4th Time trial

3rd Classica Camp de Morvedre
5th Overall Grande Prémio Internacional Beiras e Serra da Estrela
5th Trofeo Tessile & Moda
6th Overall O Gran Camiño

1st Stage 4

=== Grand Tour general classification results timeline ===
Grand Tour	2025
Giro d'Italia	—
Tour de France	—
Vuelta a España	69

Legend
—	Did not compete
DNF	Did not finish
IP	In progress
