= Gremlis Arvelo =

Venezuelan table tennis player (born 1996)

Gremlis Arvelo (born August 21, 1996) is a Venezuelan table tennis player. She competed at the 2016 Summer Olympics in the women's singles event, in which she was eliminated in the first round by Lily Zhang.
