= Franklin Archibold =

Panamanian cyclist (born 1997)

Personal information
- Full name: Franklin Erasmo Archibold Castillo
- Born: 24 August 1997 (age 29) David, Chiriquí, Panama

Cycling career
- Sport: Cycling
- Current team: Panamá es Cultura y Valores
- Discipline: Road
- Role: Rider

Amateur teams
- 2016: Taf Logistig Cubex Bike
- 2017: K. Atencio–B. Trinx–Taf Logisti
- 2017–2018: FC Panamá
- 2018: World Cycling Centre
- 2019: Eiser–Hirumet
- 2019–2020: Ininco

Professional team
- 2021–: Panamá es Cultura y Valores
Medal record
Men's road bicycle racing
Representing Panama
Pan American Championships
Silver medal – second place	2024 São José dos Campos	Time trial
Bronze medal – third place	2021 Santo Domingo	Time trial

Franklin Archibold (born 24 August 1997) is a Panamanian cyclist, who currently rides for UCI Continental team Panamá es Cultura y Valores.[1]

== Major results ==
2014
3rd Road race, National Junior Road Championships
2016
1st Road race, National Under-23 Road Championships
1st Stage 4 Tour Ciclístico de Panamá
3rd Road race, National Road Championships
2017
National Road Championships

1st Time trial
3rd Road race

National Under-23 Road Championships

1st Time trial
2nd Road race

1st Stage 10 Vuelta a Chiriquí
3rd Road race, Central American Games
3rd Overall Tour Ciclístico de Panamá

1st Stages 1, 5 & 6

2018
National Road Championships

1st Time trial
4th Road race

National Under-23 Road Championships

1st Road race
1st Time trial

3rd Overall Tour Ciclístico de Panamá
2019
1st Overall Vuelta a Chiriquí

1st Stages 4, 6 (ITT) & 7

2020
Central American Road Championships

2nd Road race
2nd Time trial

2nd Time trial, National Road Championships
3rd Overall Vuelta a Chiriquí

1st Stage 5

2021
National Road Championships

1st Road race
2nd Time trial

Central American Road Championships

1st Time trial
3rd Road race

3rd Grand Prix Gündoğmuş
7th Grand Prix Velo Alanya
2022
1st Stage 2 Vuelta a Guatemala
3rd Overall Vuelta a Formosa Internacional
5th Grand Prix Megasaray
5th Grand Prix Mediterranean
2023
National Road Championships

2nd Road race
2nd Time trial

2nd Overall Vuelta del Porvenir San Luis
2nd GP Urubici de Ciclismo
4th Grand Tour de Ciclismo de SC
5th Overall Vuelta a Formosa Internacional
5th GP Internacional de Ciclismo de Santa Catarina
7th Time trial, Pan American Road Championships
Central American Road Championships

7th Time trial
8th Road race

2024
National Road Championships

1st Road race
1st Time trial

1st Overall Vuelta a Chiriquí
2nd Time trial, Pan American Road Championships

Olympic Games
Preceded by Atheyna Bylon; Alonso Edward	Flagbearer for Panama; Paris 2024 with Hillary Heron	Succeeded by Incumbent
