= San Antonio Suchitepéquez =

Coordinates: 14°32′N 91°25′W

San Antonio Suchitepéquez (Spanish pronunciation: [san anˈtonjo sutʃiteˈpekes]) is a town, with a population of 13,666 (2018 census), and a municipality in the Suchitepéquez department of Guatemala. The municipality is located at an elevation of 300 metres to 500 metres above sea level. It has a population of 59,184 (2018 census) and covers an area of 82.8 km².

== See also ==
- Centro de Agricultura Tropical Bulbuxyá
