= Marisol Espineira =

Peruvian table tennis player (born 1968)

Personal information
- Nationality: Peruvian
- Born: 27 June 1968 (age 56)

Sport
- Sport: Table tennis

Marisol Espineira (born 27 June 1968) is a Peruvian table tennis player. She competed in the women's singles event at the 2004 Summer Olympics.
