= Panamanian Cycling Federation =

National governing body of cycle racing in Panama

The Panamanian Cycling Federation (in Spanish: Federación Panameña de Ciclismo) is the national governing body of cycle racing in Panama.

It is a member of the UCI and COPACI.
