= Edgar Torres Baltazar =

Mexican politician

- Born: 25 July 1965 (age 60); Mexico City, Mexico
- Occupation: Politician
- Political party: PRD

Edgar Torres Baltazar (born 25 July 1965) is a Mexican politician affiliated with the Party of the Democratic Revolution. In 2003–2006 he served as a federal deputy in the 59th Congress, representing the Federal District's sixth district.
