= Santa Apolonia, Chimaltenango =

Santa Apolonia
- Municipality and town
- Location within Guatemala
- Coordinates: 14°47′N 90°58′W
- Country: Guatemala
- Department: Chimaltenango

Area
  - Total: 37 sq mi (96 km^{2})

Population (2022)
  - Total: 23,751
- Time zone: UTC+6 (Central Time)
- Climate: Cwb

Santa Apolonia is a municipality in the northern part of Chimaltenango department of Guatemala. Santa Apolonia is bordered by the towns of Tecpán to the west and south, San José Poaquil to the east and San Juan Comalapa to the southeast. The geographical extension of the town is 96 square kilometers (37 mi²).

Santa Apolonia is well known for its handicrafts, particularly its earthenware pottery, although this tradition has been in decline for the past few decades. The typical indigenous blouse, or hüipil, of the town is a simple white cotton cloth with partial multichromatic embroidery patterns (pink, green, yellow, etc.). The skirt, or corte, is a navy blue with white stripes.

According to the 2002 Census, the town's population was 13,595. Officially, 81% of its population is of Maya origin although Census figures pertaining to ethnicity are highly contested. The indigenous people of Santa Apolonia predominantly pertain to the Kaqchiquel ethnic/linguistic group and some estimate informally that more than 90% of town residents speak the Maya Kaqchikel language, the third most spoken indigenous language in the country. 76.8% of inhabitants are classified as poor and 19.5% as extremely poor (the highest level in the department). According to the UNDP, the Human Development Index for the town was 0.491 in 2002, up from 0.387 in 1994, but still the lowest among all municipalities in the department. 81.4% of the population is rural.

The region is prone to frosts during the winter months and has also been affected by heavy rainfall from tropical storms and hurricanes, including Mitch in 1998 and Stan in 2006.

The principal staple crops of the area are maize and black beans. Commercially, snow peas are produced for export to markets in North America and Europe. The region produces various other horticultural products, including carrots, onions and tomatoes, as well as fruits, such as peach, passion fruit (granadilla), and soursop (anona).

The elevation at the town's center is 2,200 meters (7,200 ft) and the town is characterized by a variety of micro-climates ranging from semi-tropical to very cold.
