= Kostylev =

Kostylev (Russian: Костылев, from костыль meaning crutch) is a Russian masculine surname, its feminine counterpart is Kostyleva. It may refer to

- Aleksei Kostylev (1914–1989), Russian football player
- Elena Kostyleva (born 2011), Russian figure skater
- Gennadi Kostylev (born 1940), Russian football coach and a former player
- Leonid Kostylev (born 1989), Russian boxer
- Nikolay Kostylev (1938–1993), Russian weightlifter
- Artem Kostylev (born 1995), Software developer
- Nikolay Kostylev (born 1995), musician and producer. Member of Russian group IC3PEAK
