= Arayik =

Arayik or Araik (Armenian: Արայիկ; Russian: Араик) is a masculine given name. Notable people with the name include:

- Araik Ambartsumov, Russian amateur boxer
- Araik Baghdadyan, Armenian wrestler
- Arayik Eloyan (born 2004), Armenian footballer
- Arayik Gevorgyan (born 1973), Armenian wrestler
- Arayik Harutyunyan (born 1973), Armenian politician
- Arayik Mirzoyan (born 1987), Armenian weightlifter
- Araik Tunyan, Armenian judge
- Araik Ovsepyan (born 1995), Russian football player
