= Kim Fomin =

Soviet footballer (1914–1976)

Personal information
- Full name: Kim Yevhenovych Fomin
- Date of birth: 1914
- Place of birth: Balta, Podolian Governorate, Imperial Russia
- Date of death: 1976 (aged 61–62)
- Place of death: Odesa, Ukrainian SSR, Soviet Union
- Position: Forward

Senior career*
| Years | Team | Apps | (Gls) |
- FC Zirka
| 1930s | FC Dynamo Odesa | 26 | |
| 1937 | FC Traktor Kharkiv | 141 | |

Managerial career
- 1945: FC Pishchevik Odesa
- 1947–1950: FC Pishchevik Odesa
- 1951–1952: FC Metalurh Odesa
- 1953–1954: FSM (Note: "Futbolnaya Shkola Molodezhi" – Football School of Youth) Odesa
- 1955: FC Pishchevik Odesa
- 1956–1957: SKA Odesa
- 1960–1961: FC Avanhard Zhovti Vody (assistant)
- 1963: SKA Odesa
- 1963–1964: FC Avanhard Zhovti Vody
- * Club domestic league appearances and goals

Kim Yevhenovych Fomin (Ukrainian: Кім Євгенович Фомін, real name Akim Feofanovych Fomin; 1914 – 1976) was a Soviet Ukrainian football player and coach. He is mentioned in a book of Oleh Makarov "Vratar" (1963).

== Life ==
Born in Balta, Podolian Governorate, the Fomini family moved to Odesa before the Bolshevik coup. In Odesa, Fomin lived near the Kulykove Pole (English: Wader's Field) which was a center of the Odesa city football in the early 20th century.

After the Soviet occupation of Ukraine in 1920s, he was forced to change his name Akim Feofanovych to Kim Yevhenovych.

== Football career ==
Until 1937 he played for the Odesa's local teams including FC Dynamo Odesa finishing his career in FC Traktor Kharkiv that year.

After the World War II in 1945, Fomin became a head coach of the revived Pishchevik Odesa and with some breaks stayed with the club until 1955. After the club's relegation and its liquidation in 1950, in the 1951 Football Championship of Ukraine started out two teams from Odesa, Spartak and Metalurh and Kim Fomin was appointed a head coach of Metalurh. When in 1953 Metalurh was admitted to the Soviet Class B (later Soviet First League) competitions, Fomin was replaced by a Muscovite coach Aleksei Kostylev. Fomin continued to coach a local football school in Odesa. He returned as a head coach of Pishchevik however couple of years later due to the poor performance of the club under Kostylev's leadership. In 1955 Metalurh was reorganized and in its place was reestablished Pishchevik, while couple of years later Metalurh Odesa restarted again in the Football Championship of Ukraine. During the mid season Fomin was replaced again with an Armenian specialist.

After Pishchevik, Fomin coached another Odesa club SKA Odesa and later Avanhard Zhovti Vody.
