= Constantin Bejenaru =

Moldovan boxer

Personal information
- Nationality: Romanian
- Born: June 7, 1984 (age 42) Ungheni, Moldavian SSR, USSR (now Moldova)
- Height: 5 ft 11 in (180 cm)
- Weight: Cruiserweight

Boxing career
- Reach: 67 1/2 in (171 cm)
- Stance: Southpaw

Boxing record
- Total fights: 16
- Wins: 14
- Win by KO: 4
- Losses: 1
- No contests: 1
Medal record
Men's Amateur boxing
Representing Romania
European Amateur Championships
Bronze medal – third place	2006 Plovdiv	Light heavyweight
European Union Championships
Silver medal – second place	2006 Pécs	Light heavyweight
Silver medal – second place	2007 Dublin	Light heavyweight
Bronze medal – third place	2004 Madrid	Light heavyweight
World Combat Games
Gold medal – first place	2010 Beijing	Light heavyweight

Constantin Bejenaru (born 7 June 1984) is a Moldovan-born Romanian professional boxer living Shelton Connecticut and training Brooklyn New York, United States. He is currently trained by Ilya Mesishchev. His former coach from Bacău, is Relu Auraş.

== Amateur highlights ==
As an amateur, Bejenaru won the bronze medal at the 2006 European Amateur Boxing Championships in Plovdiv, Bulgaria, multiple medals at the European Union Amateur Boxing Championships and the gold medal at the 2010 World Combat Games.

== Professional career ==
Bejenaru turned pro in 2011, winning the first season edition of Bigger's Better, a boxing tourney under a familiar format of the popular UK Prizefighter series, with all the fights scheduled for three-minute rounds. He rocked through his first tournament in Vilnius, Lithuania, with three easy victories, until to repeat the trick later in the same year in the super final from Croatia.

== Professional boxing record ==
16 fights	14 wins	1 loss
By knockout	4	1
By decision	10	0
No contests	1	

No.	Result	Record	Opponent	Type	Round, time	Date	Location	Notes
16	Loss	14–1 (1)	Arsen Goulamirian	RTD	9 (12)	2019-12-28	Palais des Sports, Marseille, France	For WBA (Super) cruiserweight title
15	Win	14–0 (1)	Jose Humberto Corral	TKO	6 (8)	2019-07-12	Emerald Queen Casino, Tacoma, Washington, U.S.	
14	Win	13–0 (1)	Thabiso Mchunu	UD	10 (10)	2017-11-25	Mohegan Sun Arena, Uncasville, Connecticut, U.S.	Retained WBC Continental Americas & International cruiserweight titles
13	Win	12–0 (1)	Stivens Bujaj	UD	10 (10)	2016-11-04	Omega Products International, Corona, California, U.S.	Won vacant WBC Continental Americas & International cruiserweight titles
12	Win	11–0 (1)	Alexey Zubov	UD	8 (8)	2016-04-15	Turning Stone Resort Casino, Verona, New York, U.S.	
11	Win	10–0 (1)	Joel Shojgreen	UD	8 (8)	2015-10-24	Paramount Theatre, Huntington, New York, U.S.	
10	Win	9–0 (1)	Dave Valykeo	TKO	2 (6)	2015-04-18	Paramount Theatre, Huntington, New York, U.S.	
9	Win	8–0 (1)	Jon Bolden	UD	6 (6)	2014-12-20	Paramount Theatre, Huntington, New York, U.S.	
8	Win	7–0 (1)	Milen Paunov	UD	6 (6)	2014-11-14	Athletics Arena, Chișinău, Moldova	
7	Win	6–0 (1)	Tyyab Beale	UD	6 (6)	2014-09-19	Paramount Theatre, Huntington, New York, U.S.	
6	Win	5–0 (1)	Aaron Kinch	UD	6 (6)	2014-04-24	Paramount Theatre, Huntington, New York, U.S.	
5	Win	4–0 (1)	Excell Holmes	UD	4 (4)	2013-09-14	Paramount Theatre, Huntington, New York, U.S.	
4	NC	3–0 (1)	Excell Holmes	NC	2 (4)	2013-05-24	Mohegan Sun Arena, Uncasville, Connecticut, U.S.	Bejenaru suffered a cut on his forehead from an accidental head-butt
3	Win	3–0	DJ Hughley	TD	3 (4)	2013-02-15	Mohegan Sun Arena, Uncasville, Connecticut, U.S.	
2	Win	2–0	Rocky Mullooly	TKO	1 (4)	2013-01-25	Paramount Theatre, Huntington, New York, U.S.	
1	Win	1–0	Dwayne Jackson	KO	2 (4)	2012-09-28	Comanche Nation Casino, Lawton, Oklahoma, U.S.	

== See also ==
- List of male boxers
- List of southpaw stance boxers

Sporting positions
Regional boxing titles
Vacant Title last held by Olanrewaju Durodola	WBC Continental Americas cruiserweight champion November 4, 2016 – 2018; Vacated	Vacant Title next held by Samuel Clarkson
Vacant Title last held by Micki Nielsen	WBC International cruiserweight champion November 4, 2016 – 2018; Vacated	Vacant Title next held by Ilunga Makabu
