= Ambartsumov =

Ambartsumov (Armenian Համբարձումով) is a masculine surname of Armenian origin, its feminine counterpart is Ambartsumova. The surname may refer to the following notable people:

- Araik Ambartsumov, Russian boxer of Armenian descent
- Karina Ambartsumova (born 1989), Russian chess player
