= Oleksandr Usyk =

Ukrainian boxer (born 1987)

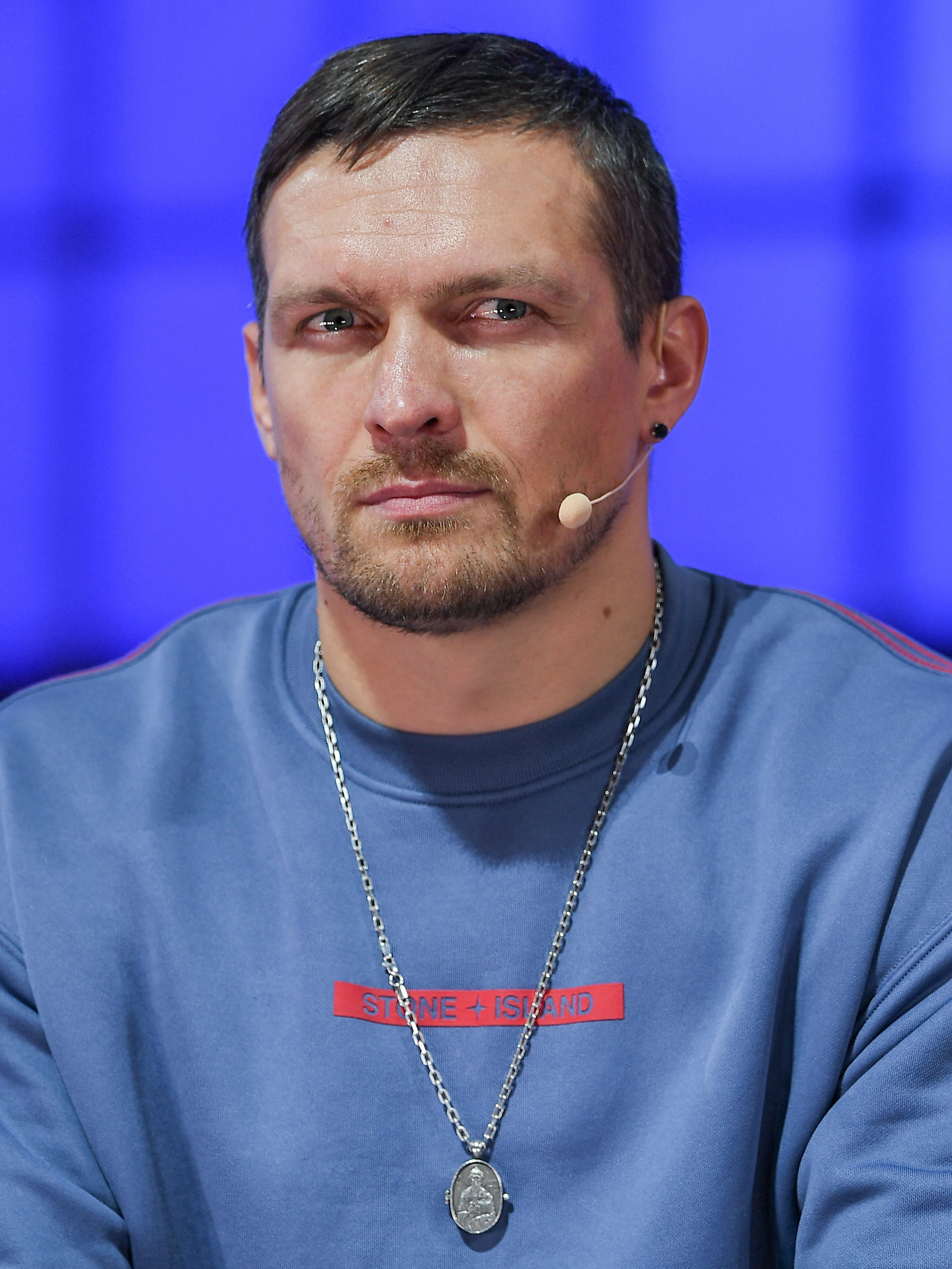
- Usyk in 2022

Personal information
- Native name: Олександр Усик
- Nickname: The Cat
- Born: 17 January 1987 (age 39) Simferopol, Crimean Oblast, Ukrainian SSR, Soviet Union
- Height: 6 ft 3 in (191 cm)
- Weight: Cruiserweight; Heavyweight
- Website: usyk.space

Signature
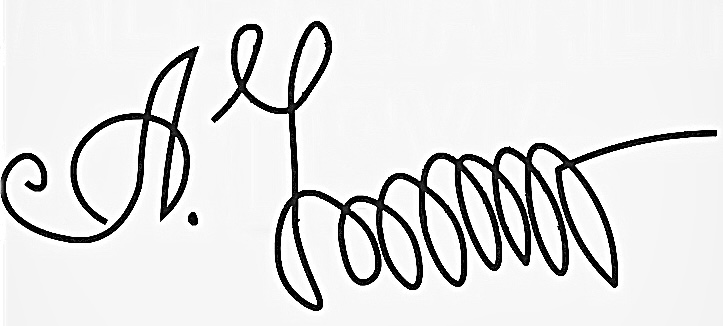

Boxing career
- Reach: 78 in (198 cm)
- Stance: Southpaw

Boxing record
- Total fights: 25
- Wins: 25
- Win by KO: 16
Medal record
Men's amateur boxing
Representing Ukraine
Olympic Games
Gold medal – first place	2012 London	Heavyweight
World Championships
Gold medal – first place	2011 Baku	Heavyweight
Bronze medal – third place	2009 Milan	Heavyweight
European Olympic Qualifying
Silver medal – second place	2008 Roseto degli Abruzzi–Pescara	Heavyweight
European Championships
Gold medal – first place	2008 Liverpool	Light-heavyweight
Bronze medal – third place	2006 Plovdiv	Middleweight
World Cup
Silver medal – second place	2008 Moscow	Heavyweight
Bronze medal – third place	2006 Baku	Light-heavyweight
Strandzha Cup
Gold medal – first place	2008 Plovdiv	Light-heavyweight
European Cup
Gold medal – first place	2010 Kharkiv	Heavyweight

Oleksandr Oleksandrovych Usyk (Ukrainian: Олександр Олександрович Усик, pronounced [olekˈsɑndr ˈusɪk]; born 17 January 1987) is a Ukrainian professional boxer. He was the undisputed world heavyweight champion twice in 2024 and 2025 and held the unified heavyweight championship from 2021 until vacating his sanctioning body titles in June 2026, and has held The Ring heavyweight title since 2022. He held the undisputed championship in two weight classes—cruiserweight and heavyweight—and is the first male boxer to become a three-time undisputed champion in the "four-belt era". Undefeated at the time of relinquishing his belts, Usyk is still considered to be lineal heavyweight champion of the world.

As an amateur, Usyk won heavyweight gold medals at the 2011 World Championships and 2012 Olympics while accumulating a record of 335 wins and 15 losses. He turned professional in 2013, winning his first world title in 2016. By winning the undisputed cruiserweight championship in 2018 at the conclusion of the World Boxing Super Series tournament, Usyk became the first Ukrainian undisputed champion in history. In 2021, Usyk defeated unified heavyweight champion Anthony Joshua to win the WBA, IBF, and WBO titles. In May 2024, Usyk defeated Tyson Fury to claim the WBC title and the undisputed championship in his second weight class, one of only three boxers to do so in the four-belt era. (Note: Third to achieve this, after Terence Crawford and Naoya Inoue.) In July 2025, he knocked out Daniel Dubois to become two-time undisputed heavyweight champion, becoming only the second boxer to do so after Muhammad Ali.

Usyk was the first undisputed heavyweight champion since Lennox Lewis was stripped of the title on 12 April 2000, and is the first and only cruiserweight and heavyweight boxer in history to hold the world titles of all four major sanctioning bodies—the World Boxing Association (WBA) (Super title), World Boxing Council (WBC), International Boxing Federation (IBF), and World Boxing Organization (WBO)—in the four-belt era. He previously held the undisputed cruiserweight championship from 2018 to 2019, and is the first boxer to become the undisputed champion in these two weight classes since Evander Holyfield in 1990. The Ring and the Boxing Writers Association of America named Usyk their Fighter of the Year in 2018 and 2024.

In February 2025, Sportico ranked Usyk at No. 7 among the highest-paid athletes of 2024, with an estimated income of $122 million. In May 2025, Forbes put him at No. 11 in its ranking of the highest-paid athletes in the world, with his earnings being estimated at $101 million.

== Early life and education ==
Usyk was born in Simferopol, Crimean Oblast, Ukrainian SSR, Soviet Union on 17 January 1987, to parents originally from northern Ukraine. His mother was born in the Chernihiv region (in the village of Rybotyn, Korop Raion), while his father was a native of Sumy. His mother worked in construction and moved to Simferopol to study. His father was a Soviet military man who passed through Afghanistan, working as a security guard in Crimea, and the two met there.

He is the first born of his family and he has two siblings. While working in a farm as a child, he was kicked in the head by horse, which he recalled as harder than any punch he ever received in boxing. In his youth, Usyk practiced folk dancing, especially styles like Hopak, and played association football until age 15, training at the SC Tavriya Simferopol specialized sports school of Olympic reserve (club's football academy).

In 2002 Usyk switched to boxing. He is a graduate of Lviv State University of Physical Culture. In his second year of school, Usyk battled life-threatening pneumonia, enduring nearly a year of illness and spending two months in the hospital before recovering.

== Amateur career ==
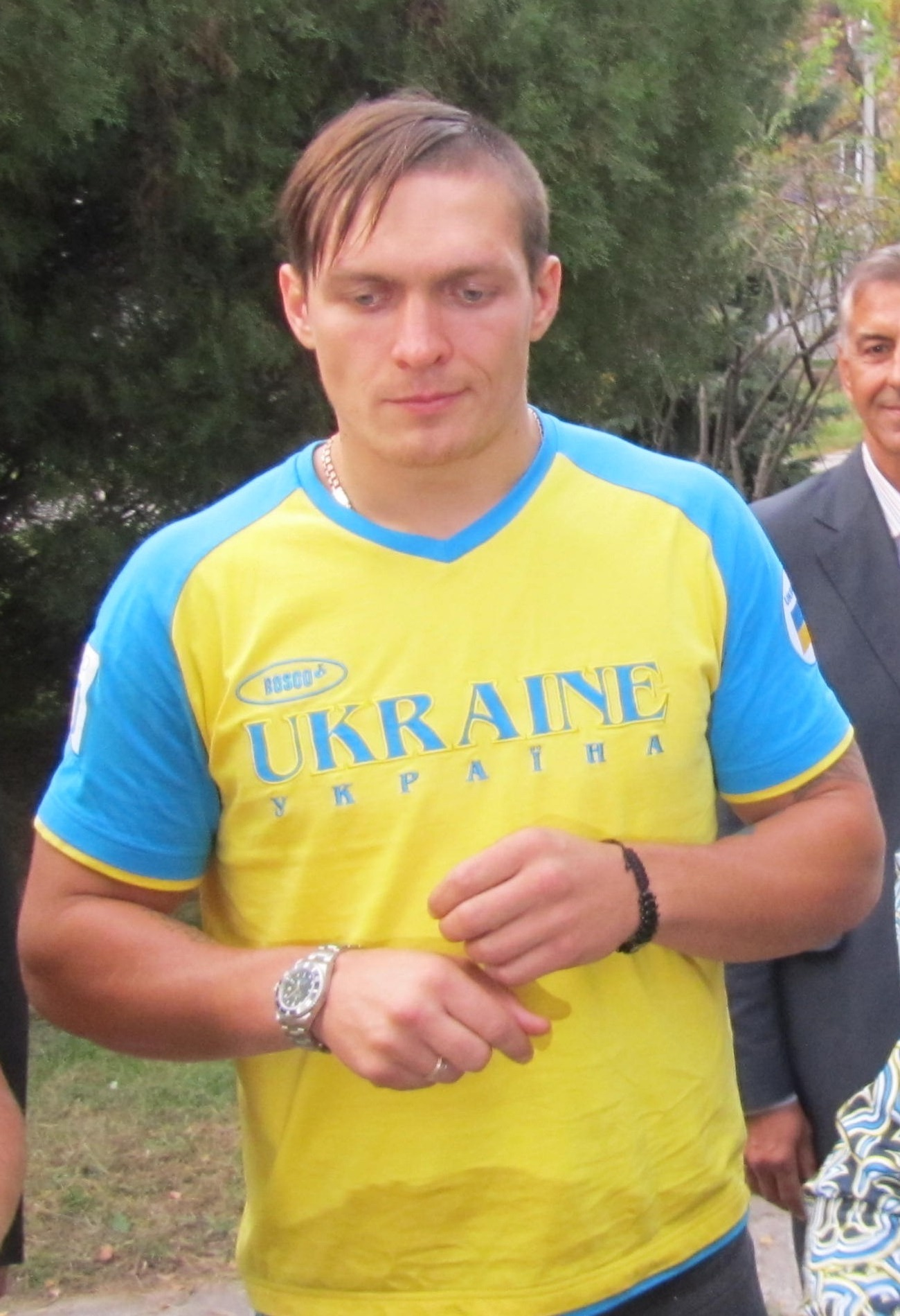
Usyk in 2012

At the 2006 European Championships he won his first three matches but lost in the semi-final to Matvey Korobov.

He then moved up to light-heavyweight later and won the Strandja Cup in 2008. In February 2008, he moved up another weight class and was sent to the Olympic qualifier in Roseto degli Abruzzi replacing European Champion Denys Poyatsyka. There he defeated world class Azeri Elchin Alizade and Daniel Price.

At the 2008 Olympic Games, Usyk outpointed Yushan Nijiati by 23–4, but lost to Clemente Russo by 4–7 in the quarter-final.

He dropped down to light-heavyweight and won gold at the 2008 European Championships, but later moved back up to heavyweight. At the 2011 World Amateur Boxing Championships he defeated Artur Beterbiev and Teymur Mammadov to win the heavyweight title and qualify for the 2012 Summer Olympics.

At the 2012 Olympic Games in London, Usyk won the gold medal, outpointing Artur Beterbiev, Tervel Pulev and Italy's Clemente Russo, outscoring him by 6–3 in the final.

Usyk retired from amateur boxing with a record of 335−15.

Prior to turning professional, he competed in the heavyweight division (91+ kg) of the 2012–13 World Series of Boxing (WSB), as part of team Ukraine Otamans, winning all six of his bouts with two by stoppage (Junior Fa by UD, Eric Brechlin by 3rd-round TKO, Joe Joyce by UD, Magomedrasul Majidov by UD, Matteo Modugno by 2nd-round TKO and Mihai Nistor by UD).

=== Highlights ===
- 2006 European Championships: Middleweight Bronze Medalist
- 2008 Strandzha Cup: Light Heavyweight Gold Medalist
- 2008 1st Olympic Qualifying Tournament: Heavyweight Silver Medalist
- 2008 European Championships: Light Heavyweight Gold Medalist
- 2008 World Cup: Heavyweight Silver Medalist
- 2009 World Championships: Heavyweight Bronze Medalist
- 2011 World Championships: Heavyweight Gold Medalist
- 2012 Olympics: Heavyweight Gold Medalist

== Professional career ==
=== Early career ===
Usyk turned professional in late 2013 at the age of 26 and signed a promotional deal with the Klitschko brothers' K2 Promotions, fighting in the cruiserweight division.

On 9 November 2013 Usyk made his professional debut by defeating Mexican fighter Felipe Romero via a fifth-round knockout. The following month he stopped 38 year old Epifanio Mendoza in four rounds. In his third professional fight on 26 April 2014, Usyk made his debut in Germany on the undercard of Klitschko-Leapai at the Koenig Pilsener Arena, defeating Ben Nsafoah via third-round knockout. A month later, Usyk returned home and scored a fourth-round knockout-victory over Argentine Cesar David Crenz.

=== Rise up the ranks ===
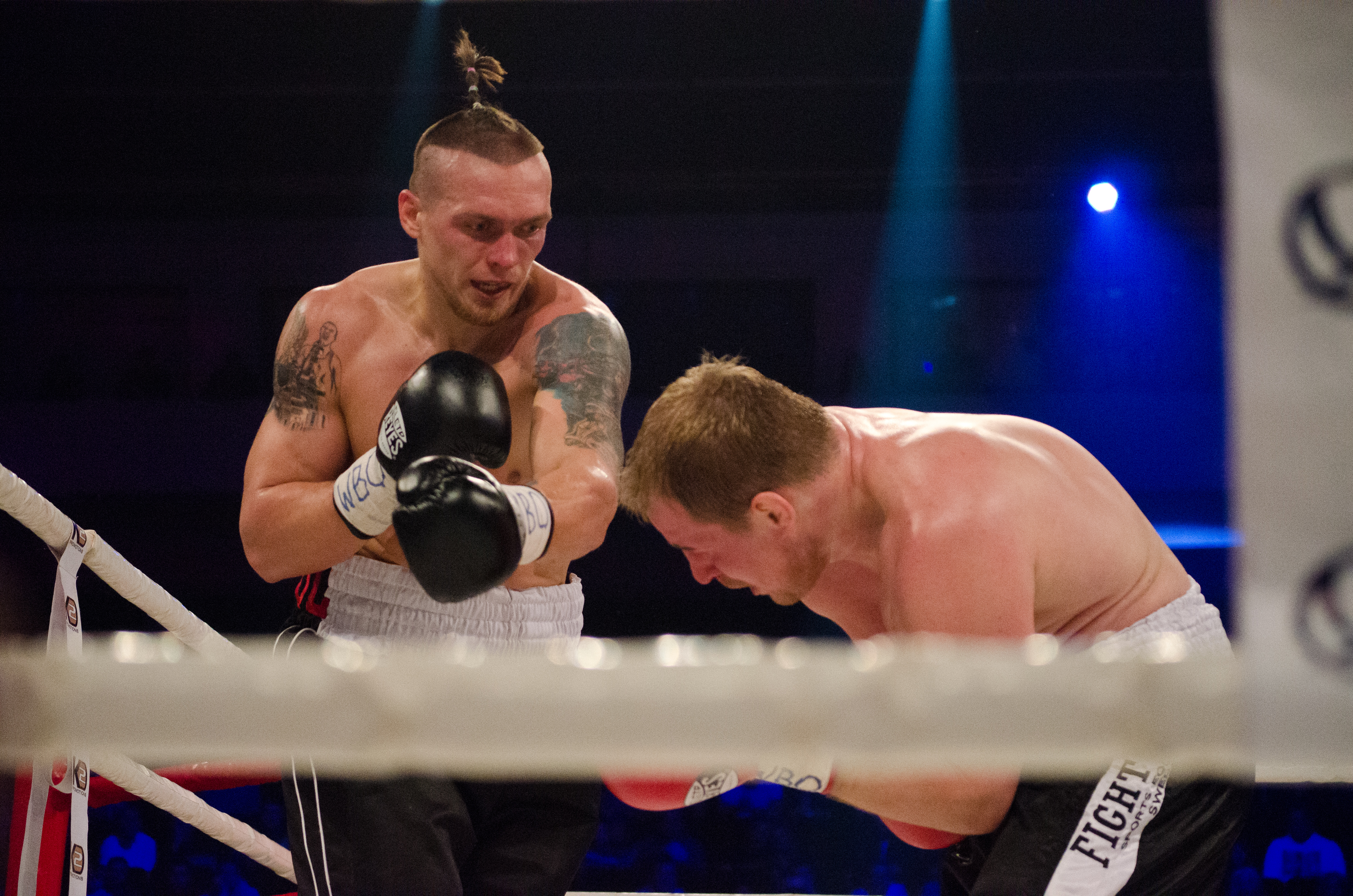
Usyk's fight with Andrey Knyazev attracted 3.6 million viewers on Ukrainian television

Usyk won his first title on 4 October 2014, after beating South African boxer Daniel Bruwer via seventh-round technical knockout (TKO) for the interim WBO Inter-Continental cruiserweight title. Usyk defended the title two months later, stopping 35 year old Danie Venter in the ninth-round. Usyk was ahead on all three judges' scorecards at the time of stoppage.

Usyk made another defence on 18 April 2015, against former Russian cruiserweight champion Andrey Knyazev (11–1, 6 KOs) in Kyiv. After seven one-sided rounds, referee Mickey Vann finally stopped the fight in round eight after deciding Knyazev had taken too much punishment. This win kept Usyk on course to a WBO title fight against then champion Marco Huck.

On 29 August 2015, Usyk defeated former South African light heavyweight champion Johnny Muller via third-round TKO at the Sport Palace in Kyiv, which saw Usyk control the fight with a jab. Usyk knocked down Muller twice in round three and although Muller protested, the referee waved the fight off with one second of the round left.

Usyk made a fourth and final defense against unknown Cuban boxer Pedro Rodriguez in a scheduled 12-round fight on 12 December at the Sport Palace. Usyk won the fight scoring his ninth straight knockout in as many fights, first dropping Rodriguez in round six with an uppercut before the fight was stopped in round seven, being knocked down again, although he beat the count. This win put Usyk at the WBO's number 1 position, with a World title fight on the cards for 2016.

=== WBO cruiserweight champion ===
==== Usyk vs. Głowacki ====
In June 2016, it was announced that Usyk would challenge undefeated Polish boxer Krzysztof Głowacki (26–0, 16 KOs) for his WBO cruiserweight title on 17 September, at the Ergo Arena, Gdansk, Poland. It was reported that Usyk's trainer James Ali Bashir wanted to recruit former world champion Antonio Tarver as a sparring partner. It was said that Tarver not only requested too much money, but also wanted to appear on the card as a co-featured main event. Głowacki weighed 199.3 pounds, with Usyk coming in slightly lighter at 198.75 pounds. The fight was shown live on Sky Sports in the UK. On the night, Usyk outpointed Głowacki after an exciting 12-round fight with the judges scoring it 119–109, 117–111, and 117–111 all in Usyk's favour. The decision win also ended Usyk's knockout streak. Usyk dominated the fight with his footwork, superior hand speed and spearing jab, injuring Głowacki's eye early in the fight, causing a cut that continued to bleed for the remainder of the contest.

==== Usyk vs. Mchunu ====
Usyk announced he would be making his American debut on the Bernard Hopkins vs. Joe Smith Jr. undercard on 17 December 2016. The fight would take place at the Forum in Inglewood, California. On 11 November K2 Promotions announced Usyk would be defending his WBO title against 28 year old South African boxer Thabiso Mchunu (17–2, 11 KOs). Mchunu previously lost to Ilunga Makabu via eleventh-round stoppage, although being ahead on the scorecards at the time. The fight started out slow, causing the fans in attendance to boo with displeasure. The pace picked up after the first couple of rounds when Usyk began breaking down Mchunu with his trademark, accurate combinations. Usyk scored a knockdown in the sixth round, and a further two more in the ninth, causing referee Lou Moret to wave off the fight at 2:53 of round 9. CompuBox statistics showed that Usyk landed 163 of 517 punches thrown (32%), and Mchunu landed 76 of his 278 (27%).

Prior to the fight, Usyk spoke of his desire to fight other cruiserweight titlists as well as fighting Anthony Joshua at heavyweight. The fight averaged 560,000 viewers on HBO: this was considered good numbers, considering it was Usyk's HBO debut and on the undercard.

==== Usyk vs. Hunter ====
K2 Promotions announced that Usyk would be returning to regular HBO to defend his cruiserweight world title in April 2017. He was originally planned to appear on the undercard of the Golovkin-Jacobs HBO PPV in March at Madison Square Garden; however, since Román González and Carlos Cuadras were scheduled to appear in separate fights and not fight each other, Usyk was pulled from the card.

On 12 February 2017, Usyk announced that he had parted ways with long time trainer James Ali Bashir and replaced him with Vasiliy Lomachenko's father and trainer, Anatoly Lomachenko. Bob Arum announced that Usyk would be part of a triple header including Vasiliy Lomachenko at the MGM National Harbor in Oxon Hill, Maryland, on 8 April 2017 against Michael Hunter (12–0, 8 KOs). Usyk weighed 199.4 whilst Hunter came in at 199 pounds. In front of a sold-out crowd of 2,828, where there was majority Ukrainian fans in attendance, Usyk was taken the distance for the second time in his career and won a rather one-sided unanimous decision to retain his WBO title. Hunter unexpectedly controlled the first three rounds behind the jab. It wasn't until the fourth round, when Usyk took control of the bout using his left and connecting well to the body to win the majority of the remaining rounds. Pundits thought Hunter was gifted going the distance and the fight should have been stopped by referee Bill Clancy in the championship rounds. In the last minute of round 12, it appeared Hunter, while taking punches, was only standing because the ropes where holding him up. The referee halted the action and gave Hunter a standing eight count, ruling it a knockdown for Usyk. All three judges scored the fight unanimously 117–110 for Usyk. Although it took him a few rounds to get into the fight, Usyk was happy with his performance and called out other titleholders, "I'm very happy with my performance. I did what I wanted to do. He took a lot of punches. I thought maybe they would stop the fight (in the 12th round). I'd love to fight any of the titleholders, any time, any place."

According to CompuBox punch stats, Usyk landed 321 of his 905 punches thrown, 36%. Hunter managed to land 24% of his punches, connecting 190 of 794. The fight drew an average of 679,000 viewers on HBO and peaked at 774,000 viewers.

=== World Boxing Super Series ===
On 1 July 2015, Usyk finally announced that he would join fellow cruiserweights Mairis Briedis, Murat Gassiev, Yuniel Dorticos, Marco Huck and Krzysztof Włodarczyk in the eight-man bracket style tournament, due to start in September 2017. He said, "I feel happy and inspired with the idea of such a tournament. I've been dreaming of putting together all the champs to see who is the strongest and becomes the undisputed king of the division." The draw was to take place on 8 July in Monte Carlo. The winner of the tournament would receive a grand money prize and the Muhammad Ali trophy.

==== Usyk vs. Huck ====
At the Draft Gala, Usyk, who had first pick, chose to fight former WBO champion Marco Huck (40–4–1, 27 KOs). When asked why he chose Huck, Usyk said, "Because of my fans." Huck, who was equally excited, replied that Usyk was his 'wish opponent'. On 26 July it was announced that the fight would take place at the Max-Schmeling-Halle in Berlin on 9 September 2017. This would mark the second time Usyk would fight in Germany as a professional, having fought there in his third professional bout in April 2014. It would also mark the first fight of the tournament.

On 6 September 2017, at the final press-conference, Huck pushed Usyk in the face-off. In regards to the shove, Huck said, "I wanted to show Usyk that he is in my hometown and that he should be prepared for the battle of his life on Saturday." Usyk, who remained professional and calm, replied, "If you want to be a great champion, you have to beat the best and Huck is one of the best. I chose to enter this tournament because it is a path to achieve my dream of unifying all the belts. There's a prestigious trophy at stake too, the Muhammad Ali Trophy. We were born on the same day and I admire Ali because he is the biggest role model in boxing and I will thank God if I win a trophy with his name on it." As he was leaving the building, Usyk claimed he would 'bury' Huck.

On fight night, Usyk used his footwork and combination punching to cruise to a TKO win. On top of his dominant performance, Usyk taunted Huck throughout the fight. In round 8, Usyk tripped on Huck's feet and Huck lost a point on the scorecards as he threw a punch at Usyk when the latter was down. Usyk continued to land combinations with little to no response from Huck until referee Robert Byrd stopped the fight in the tenth-round. With the win, Usyk progressed to the semi-final stage of the Super Series and was to face the winner of the Mairis Briedis vs. Mike Perez, scheduled for 30 September.

=== Unified cruiserweight champion ===
==== Usyk vs. Briedis ====
Usyk would next fight Mairis Briedis (23–0, 18 KOs) following the latter's win over Perez via unanimous decision. In November 2017, it was reported the fight would take place on 27 January 2018 in Riga, Latvia, a week before Gassiev vs. Dorticos takes place. Arēna Rīga was confirmed as the location by Comosa's Chief Boxing Officer Kalle Sauerland. Usyk came in at 199.5 pounds and Briedis weighed 199.1 pounds. Usyk moved on to the final of the tournament after winning a close fight against Briedis via majority decision. With a high work rate, Usyk controlled most of the fight with his jab, applying pressure when needed. Briedis was credited with landing the harder punches. The opening four rounds were closely contested, with Usyk receiving a cut over his right eye from an accidental clash of heads in the third round. From round five, Usyk became busier and took control of the fight, although he was still hit with some hard shots to the head from Briedis. One judge scored the fight 114–114, whilst the remaining two judges scored the fight 115–113 in favour of Usyk, giving him the win. After the fight, Usyk stated it was the hardest fight of his career. According to CompuBox Stats, Usyk landed 212 of 848 punches thrown (25%) and Briedis was more accurate, landing 195 of his 579 thrown (33.7%). Usyk landed 40% of his power punches. Many boxers and pundits praised the fight.

=== Undisputed cruiserweight champion ===
==== Usyk vs. Gassiev ====
After Usyk defeated Briedis, it was announced in the post-fight press conference that the final would take place in Jeddah, Saudi Arabia, on 11 May 2018. However, once Murat Gassiev (26–0, 19 KOs) stopped Yuniel Dorticos, setting up the final, the secretary general of the Russian Boxing Federation, Umar Kremlev, stated that he would push forward in order to outbid Saudi Arabia and have the final of the tournament take place in Russia on the Day of Russian Boxing on 22 July. On 16 April, it was reported that Usyk had suffered an elbow injury during training, pushing the final to possibly June or July 2018. On 18 June, at a press conference, Kremlev announced the final would take place on 21 July at the Olympic Stadium, Moscow, Russia. On 29 June, the final was officially confirmed. On the release date, 7,000 tickets were sold. Both boxers came in at 198.45 pounds at the weigh-in.

Usyk quickly took control of the fight, moving rapidly and using his "beautiful, commandeering jab", while not allowing Gassiev to use his power. Gassiev did not land a solid punch until the end of round 2. According to many reports, Usyk outclassed, outboxed, and dominated Gassiev. The result was never in question as Usyk was declared the winner by unanimous decision, with the judges’ scorecards reading 120–108, 119–109, and 119–109. Usyk's dominance was reflected in the punch stats, as CompuBox recorded him landing 252 of 939 thrown punches (27%), compared to Gassiev's 91 landed of 313 thrown (29%). Usyk used his superior conditioning to finish the fight, increasing his output by landing 47 of 117 punches thrown in round 12. Usyk managed to withstand the 32 power body shots he received and continued to move around the ring. Muhammad Ali's widow, Lonnie Ali, presented the trophy to Usyk. After the fight, both combatants were exemplars of good sportsmanship, embracing, with Gassiev saying "I had the best opponent of my professional career ... today is Oleksandr's day". Usyk humbly added "My team made me look like I looked in the ring. This is our victory". The win made Usyk the first ever four-belt undisputed cruiserweight champion.

When asked whom he would like to fight next, Usyk said, "At this time I have heard that Tony Bellew wants to fight the winner of the Muhammad Ali Trophy. I hope he will see me talking.... 'hey Tony Bellew, are you ready?' If he doesn't want to go down [in weight], I will go up [in weight] for him. I will eat more spaghetti for my dinner!" Also after the fight Usyk said: "Olympic [stadium], thanks. People, countrymen and those who supported. Moscow 2018. Bang! Daddy's in the building!".

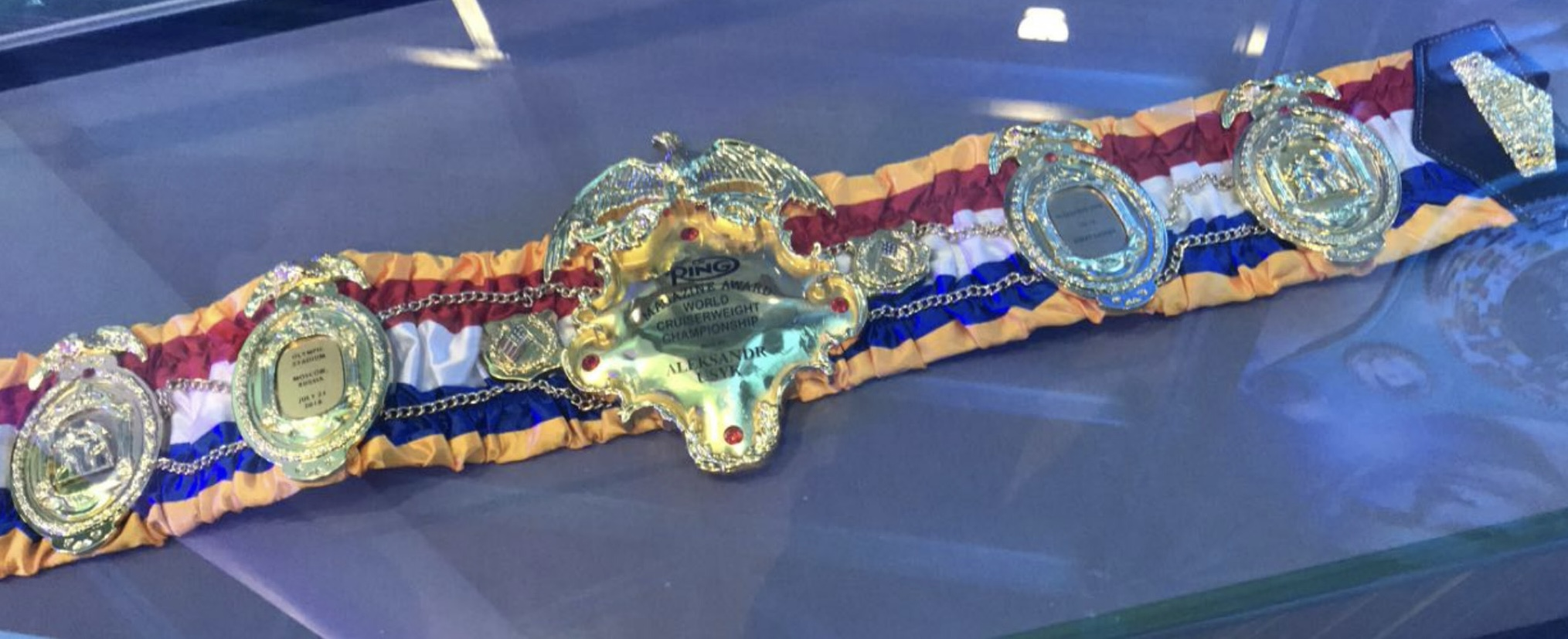
Usyk's Ring magazine cruiserweight belt on show at the media workout

==== Usyk vs. Bellew ====
After calling out Tony Bellew (30–2–1, 20 KOs) after winning the tournament, Bellew responded via social media that he would accept the fight; however, he stated the fight would need to take place in 2018 and be for the undisputed cruiserweight championship. Bellew believed a fight at heavyweight would not be as appealing as he would not gain much with a win. Bellew also stated it would be his last fight as a professional. By the end of July, it was said the fight would likely take place in November 2018 in London. After positive meetings between Bellew's promoter Eddie Hearn and K2's Alexander Krassyuk, on 20 August, Boxing Scene reported the fight was likely to take place on 10 November 2018. A week later, K2 Promotions confirmed the date of the fight. On 5 September, the WBA ordered Usyk to start negotiating with Denis Lebedev (30–2, 22 KOs), who was their 'champion in recess' and gave them until the first week of October 2018 to complete negotiations. There was said to be a stumbling block for the potential Usyk vs. Bellew fight. According to Hearn, the fight was likely to be pushed back to 2019. Prior to negotiations, Bellew stated the fight must happen in 2018.

On 7 September, Usyk signed a multi-fight deal with Matchroom Boxing, which meant he would fight exclusively on Sky Sports in the UK and DAZN in USA. The agreement meant Matchroom would co-promote Usyk alongside K2 Promotions. Usyk's next fight would be confirmed 'in the very near future', according to Hearn. A week after signing with Matchroom, the Usyk vs. Bellew fight was announced to take place on 10 November at the Manchester Arena, live and exclusive on Sky Box Office. Experienced British referee Terry O'Connor was named as the official. Bellew weighed 199 1/4 pounds, just over 2 years since he last made the cruiserweight limit and Usyk weighed 198 1/4 pounds.

On fight night, Usyk, who is usually a slow starter, eventually took full control of the bout and stopped Bellew in round 8 to retain all the cruiserweight belts. The official time of the stoppage was at 2:00 of round 8. There was very little action in round 1 as both boxers showed each other respect. It was a feeling out round. Due to the lack of action, the crowd began to boo towards the end of the first. Overall, Usyk landed just 3 jabs and Bellew landed 1 power shot. Round 2 was similar, however Bellew stepped on the gas, managed to land some clean shots along with some showboating. Bellew took control in round 3, landing two straight right hands. Usyk began using his jab more and after landing an overhand left, Bellew was left slightly shaken. By the end of round 4, Bellew was backed up against the ropes and looked to tire. Bellew aimed most of his shots to Usyk's body and by round 7, was missing a lot of shots, mostly due to Usyk's foot movement, and ended the round with a bloody nose. In round 8, whilst in a neutral corner, Usyk landed a hard left, again buzzing Bellew, forcing him to move away against the ropes. Another left hand wobbled Bellew before Usyk finished him off with another left, dropping Bellew backwards with his head landing on the bottom rope. A brave Bellew tried to get up slowly and beat the count but referee Terry O'Connor stopped the fight. Bellew's 10-fight winning streak came to an end. Judges Alejandro Cid and Steve Gray scored the first seven rounds 68–65 and 67–66 respectively in favour of Bellew and Yury Koptsev had the fight 67–67 entering round 8.

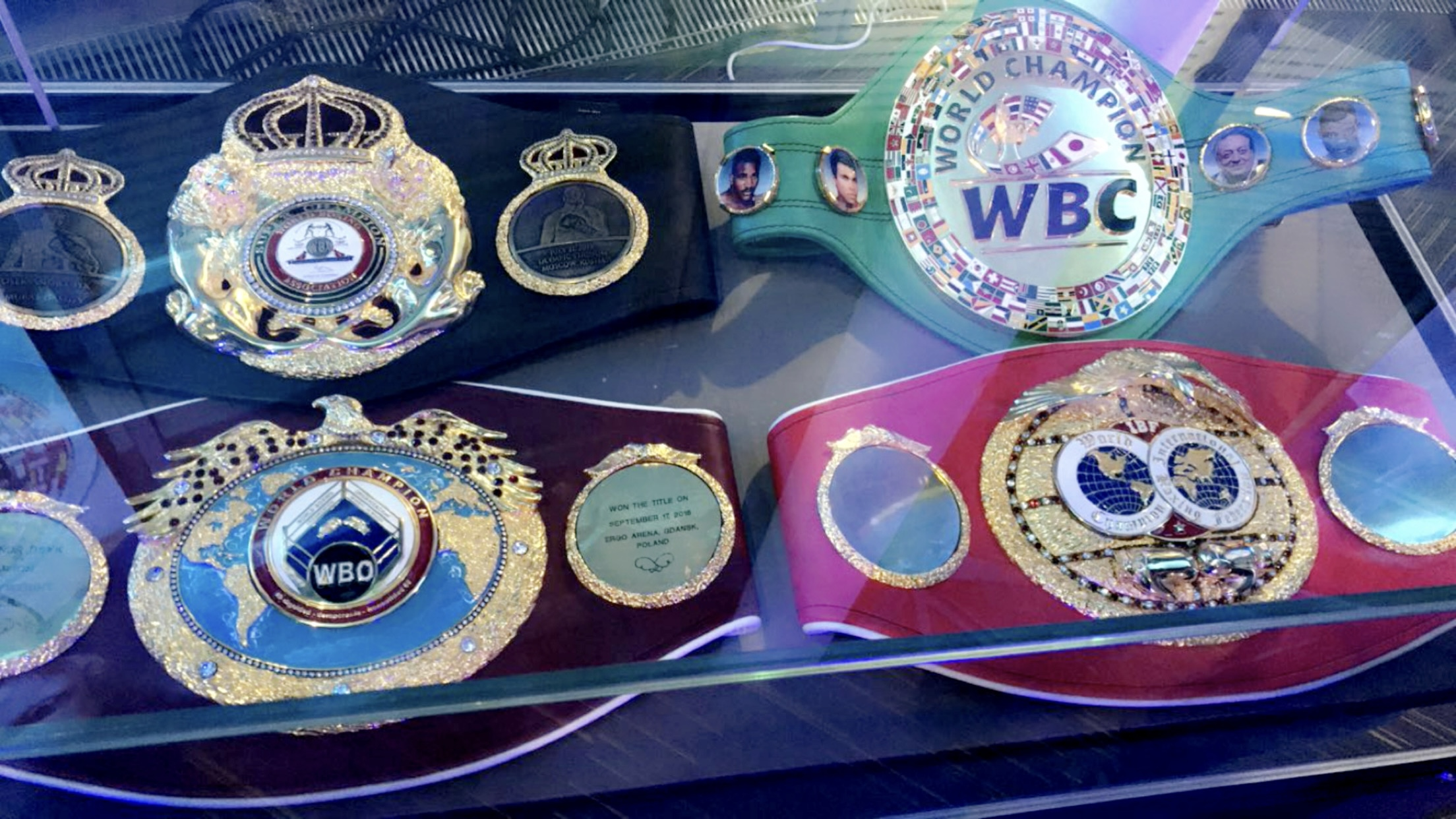
Usyk's Undisputed Cruiserweight Titles

Afterwards, Bellew paid tribute to Usyk and announced his retirement from boxing, saying; "I have been doing this for 20 years, and it is over." Usyk stated 2018 was the most difficult year of his career, but most successful. "We need to put goals in front of us and move towards them," Usyk later stated. There was a small concern during Bellew's post-fight interview as many felt he was clearly concussed. According to CompuBox stats, Usyk landed 112 of his 424 punches thrown (26%) and Bellew landed 61 of his 268 thrown (23%). Both landed 47 power shots each.

=== Heavyweight ===
"I've been boxing since I was 15 years old. They kept telling me that I shouldn't be boxing. They told me that I wouldn't become an Olympic champion or a world champion and that I shouldn't have switched to the heavyweight division. But these were opinions from people who couldn't do it themselves. Personally, I keep praying and move forward. I don't worry about whether I will reach my destination."

— Usyk, on his unusual career path.

After defeating Bellew, Usyk declared his intention to move up to heavyweight. Carlos Takam (36–5–1, 28 KOs) was announced as his opponent, with the fight scheduled for 25 May 2019. On 7 May, it was reported that Usyk had suffered a bicep injury. The bout was rescheduled for a date in September, to be featured on DAZN. On 22 August, following the Golovkin vs. Derevyanchenko press conference, promoter Eddie Hearn revealed in an interview that Carlos Takam is "out of the fight" and "will not be taking the fight". Usyk also had the option to challenge the winner of the rematch between Andy Ruiz Jr. and Anthony Joshua for the WBA (Super), IBF, WBO and IBO heavyweight titles as the mandatory for the WBO belt, as per WBO regulations, which allow a 'super champion' of a weight class to become an immediate mandatory challenger when moving up or down in weight.

==== Usyk vs. Witherspoon ====
On 3 September 2019, it was announced by Matchroom Boxing and K2 Promotions that Usyk's heavyweight debut as well as his American debut would be on 12 October, at the Wintrust Arena in Chicago, Illinois, against 33 year old undefeated heavyweight Tyrone Spong (14–0, 13 KOs). Spong held the WBO and WBC Latino heavyweight titles and was only taken the distance in 2018 where he defeated Ytalo Perea. Usyk wanted to challenge himself on his first heavyweight fight. He acknowledged Spong for being fast and powerful. Usyk's US debut was coming along as a success before even stepping into the ring as only two weeks after the fight was announced, over 6,000 tickets were sold, including all lower bowl and floor seats. it was said that around 600 tickets remained. A few days before the fight, Spong tested positive for a banned substance, clomiphene, and the fight was thrown into disarray. Promoter Eddie Hearn said there were several backup fighters being considered. Spong and his team were not happy that Eddie Hearn had received the news and already put out a post on his social media about Spong being replaced before they had received an email about it. The announced face-off that day was immediately called off. According to Spong's manager Marcos Gonzales, he had been tested negative for other tests. On the positive test, Spong said, "This is a set up. I vehemently deny that I have ever taken the substance named in VADA's report. I have asked for testing of the B sample at a laboratory of my choosing. Testing performed last week at the request of the Illinois Boxing Commission showed, what I’ve always known, that I'm a clean fighter." Eddie Hearn confirmed that there was a shortlist of replacements.

Spong's replacement was then announced as 38 year old Chazz Witherspoon (38–3, 29 KOs), mostly known for being former WBA and WBC heavyweight champion Tim Witherspoon's cousin. Witherspoon, who was on an 8-fight win streak, said he had been training, waiting for a possible call-up. He also warned Usyk, "I have been in training ready for a big fight, and it doesn't get bigger than this. Oleksandr is stepping up to Heavyweight – and he's going to find out that it's a totally different game." Witherspoon felt this was his time to show everyone what he can do on the big stage. For his heavyweight debut, Usyk weighed in at 215 pounds and Witherspoon stepped on the scales at 242 pounds. On fight night, Spong issued a statement confirming his 3rd urine sample, which was tested on October 2, came out as negative, re-iterating his stance as being a clean fighter. He also suggested that the previous two positive results had been manipulated and asked who was responsible.

In front of 9,073 in attendance, Usyk won the fight as Witherspoon retired in his corner after round 7. Witherspoon was more active during the opening rounds. He landed some hard shots which left some bruising over Usyk's right eye. Usyk tried to land shots on the backfoot. By round 5, Witherspoon had slowed down. he was frequently against the ropes and Usyk was able to land clean shots at will. By the end of round 7, it was all Usyk. Witherspoon sat on his stool in the corner exhausted and his trainer Tommy Brooks, told referee Hector Afu to call the fight. During the post-fight interviews, when asked if he could have stopped Witherspoon earlier, Usyk said, "I did what my trainer told me to do. I just follow their orders and that was to box. And I did box but if I had the opportunity, I would take that opportunity." Usyk was also asked if it felt different at the weight to which he replied, "Yes, there is a little bit of difference but I used to fight as a heavyweight. But yes, it was different." Usyk referred to fight at heavyweight during the amateurs. When asked about Usyk's power, Witherspoon said he was not hurt by Usyk's punches, rather criticized his own conditioning for the fight. Witherspoon also predicted that Usyk would be successful as a heavyweight. According to Compubox, Usyk landed 139 punches of 347 thrown (40.1%) and Witherspoon landed only 21 of his 208 thrown (10.1%). Witherspoon did not land more than six punches in a round. Following his heavyweight debut, Usyk said he was ready for a world title fight, mentioning the likes of Anthony Joshua and Andy Ruiz who were due to fight in December in a rematch. Usyk was WBO's mandatory challenger, so could challenge the winner.

==== Usyk vs. Chisora ====
On 11 March 2020, it was announced that Usyk would fight former world title challenger Derek Chisora (32–9, 23 KOs) on 23 May at The O2 Arena in London. The fight was to take place on Sky Sports Box Office in the UK and on DAZN in the US. Sky Sports’ Head of Boxing Development Adam Smith, described the fight a "classic Heavyweight clash". If successful, Usyk would be first in line to fight for the WBO heavyweight title held by Anthony Joshua.

On 17 March, there was already talks about sports events being cancelled around UK due to the COVID-19 pandemic. Matchroom Boxing had already cancelled their shows around the world for March and April. Hearn confirmed he had contingency plans in place in case any fights were postponed. He had back-up dates in lined up for the Summer. As the days continued, Hearn admitted it was looking less likely the fight would take place on the original scheduled date. On 30 March, the British Boxing Board of Control extended the suspension until the end of May, following the guidelines from government and medical authorities, meaning the fight would be postponed. Hearn hinted the fight could take place in Saudi Arabia, if the country was to exit lockdown before the UK. Haye told IFL tv the fight needed to take place in front of a crowd.

A date in October 2020 was being discussed. Usyk and Chisora had continued to train for the upcoming fight. The fight was pushed back to 31 October 2020 because of the pandemic and the venue was moved to The SSE Arena in London. According to CBS Sports, Chisora was a +475 betting underdog. Usyk was reported to earn a £1.8 million purse. For his second heavyweight fight, Usyk weighed 217¼ pounds and Chisora weighed 255½ pounds, a 38 pound weight advantage.

On the night, Usyk used his superior footwork and stamina to wear down Chisora and win a unanimous decision victory with scores of 117–112, 115–113, 115–113. In doing so, Usyk passed his first major test at heavyweight. Chisora had become worn and exhausted later on in the fight, struggling to keep up with Usyk. Usyk showed a good chin having taken some big shots from Chisora, who started off the fight quicker. This was one of the reasons for the close cards. Usyk is known for starting slow to figure out his opponents. Many thought Usyk could have tried to end the fight inside the distance from the 9th round as Chisora was showing signs of exhaustion.

In his post-fight interview, Usyk reiterated his desire to fight Joshua, saying "Anthony, how are you? I'm coming for you, Anthony." Usyk said he didn't want to become just champion, but undisputed champion. Chisora felt he should have won the fight. He said, “Yeah, 100 percent. I was pushing the pace, I gave a couple of rounds away but I was pushing the pace. But the judges saw it a different way." His corner told him between rounds that he was ahead. Compubox showed that Usyk landed 194 of his 674 punches thrown (29%) and Chisora landed 139 of his 625 thrown (22%). Chisora did have the end on power punches, landed 110 compared to 107 from Usyk.

=== Unified heavyweight champion ===
==== Usyk vs. Joshua ====
Unified heavyweight champion Anthony Joshua, for whom Usyk was the WBO mandatory challenger, had been in negotiations to fight undefeated WBC and The Ring champion Tyson Fury. However, when it appeared that Fury would instead be forced to face former WBC champion Deontay Wilder in a trilogy bout due to an arbitration ruling, the WBO gave Joshua's camp 48 hours to come to an agreement for the fight with Fury on 21 May 2021, or they would instead order Joshua to face Usyk. Joshua and Fury's camps could not reach an agreement, and thus on 22 May the WBO issued the instruction that Joshua would have to fight Usyk, with an agreement for the bout to be in place by 31 May. Usyk reacted to these developments with a video message directed to Joshua's promoter Eddie Hearn, telling him, "Eddie, I want money, more money."

On 20 July, an official announcement was made, confirming that the fight between Usyk and Joshua would be taking place on 25 September at Tottenham Hotspur Stadium. There was an announced crowd of 66,267 in attendance. Although many fans and pundits doubted Usyk would have the size or power to trouble Joshua, Usyk produced an upset, outboxing the champion and rocking him several times over 12 rounds to claim a unanimous decision victory, with scores of 117–112, 116–112 and 115–113, and retained his undefeated record. Reflecting upon his performance in his post-fight interview, Usyk said, "This means a lot for me. The fight went the way I expected it to go. There were moments when Anthony pushed me hard but it was nothing special. I had no objective to knock him out because my corner pushed me not to do that. In the beginning, I tried to hit him hard, but then I stuck to my job." According to CompuBox, Usyk landed 148 of 529 punches thrown (28%) and Joshua landed 123 of 641 thrown (19%). Usyk landed 29 shots in the final round.

On 22 June, it was announced that a rematch was scheduled to take place in Jeddah, Saudi Arabia on 20 August with Usyk defending the WBA, WBO and IBF championship belts, and Joshua, as the challenger.

==== Usyk vs. Joshua II ====
On 29 September 2021, four days after Usyk defeated Anthony Joshua to become unified world heavyweight champion, it was announced by his promoter Alexander Krassyuk that a one-sided rematch clause which had been specified in the fight contract had "already been activated in principle, from the side of Joshua." Krassyuk noted that Usyk relished the prospect of squaring off against Joshua twice: "So I remember when we discussed with Oleksandr the issue of rematch, he was delighted and said 'Wow, cool, I will beat Antokha [sic] twice.'" Regarding the venue of the rematch, Usyk made it known that he hoped it would take place in his native country of Ukraine, saying, "I would love to have the rematch at Olimpiyskiy Stadium in Kyiv." However, Joshua's promoter, Eddie Hearn, stated that Ukraine was a "very unlikely" venue, as he wanted to maximise income: "I think it will be international or the UK, I would think it would be in the UK."

With the Russian invasion of Ukraine on 24 February 2022, a potential Usyk–Joshua rematch was thrown into doubt. In the days following the start of the invasion, Usyk posted on his social media channels to confirm that he had returned to Ukraine, and to plead with Russian president Vladimir Putin to stop the invasion, with one video captioned "NO WAR". On 2 March, Usyk confirmed in a video interview with American news network CNN that he had taken up arms and joined a territorial defence battalion in Ukraine. Regarding his professional boxing career, Usyk said, "I really don't know when I'm going to be stepping back in the ring. My country and my honour are more important to me than a championship belt." In late March, it was reported that Usyk would be leaving Ukraine to begin preparations for the rematch with Joshua. Usyk revealed his decision to leave his homeland and refocus his efforts on boxing was supported by Mayor of Kyiv and former heavyweight champion Vitali Klitschko, as well as his younger brother Wladimir Klitschko, also a former heavyweight champion who had been defeated by Anthony Joshua in 2017.

On 19 June 2022, it was officially announced that Usyk would be facing Joshua in a rematch in Jeddah, Saudi Arabia on 20 August. The fight marked the first defense of Usyk's world heavyweight titles, whilst it was Joshua's twelfth consecutive world heavyweight title fight. The fight was also an attempt by Joshua to become a three-time world heavyweight champion.

Despite Joshua's much improved performance compared to his first loss to Usyk, the latter successfully defended his belts by a split decision with one judge, Glenn Feldman, scoring the fight 115–113 to Joshua, while the other two judges scoring it 115–113 and 116–112 in Usyk's favour. The split decision was controversial as the majority of viewers expected a unanimous decision for Usyk. The Ring magazine called Glenn Feldman's scorecard "horrible". Among those criticizing his judging were promoter Lou DiBella and boxing trainer Teddy Atlas.

According to New York Times statistics, Joshua landed 37 body punches compared to 15 in their first fight. Overall, however, Usyk outperformed Joshua, landing 170 of 712 punches, compared with 124 of 492 for Joshua. According to CompuBox, Usyk established new records for punches landed by an opponent (170) and most punches landed on Joshua in a single round (39 punches in the 10th round).

==== Usyk vs. Dubois ====
On 3 April 2023, the WBA officially ordered the world title consolidation between unified heavyweight champion Usyk and WBA 'regular' titleholder Daniel Dubois (19–1, 18 KOs). Both parties were given a 30-day negotiation period. Earlier reports suggested the fight could take place in London or Manchester, England. Although no date or location had been confirmed, Alex Krassyuk stated the fight could take place in a stadium in Poland. In May 2023, purse bids were held. Usyk's career-long promoter Krassyuk gained control of the fight with a massive bid of $8,057,000, which was more than the $5,620,050 submitted by Queensberry Promotions. A fight date in August was being eyed. As per the purse splits, Usyk was to take home $6,042,750 (75% of the winning bid) and Dubois was to take a career-high $2,014,250 payday. The fight took place on 26 August at the Stadion Wroclaw in Wrocław, Poland for Usyk's WBA (Super), IBF, WBO, IBO and The Ring titles. The date aligned with Ukraine's Independence Day. An attendance of around 24,000 was expected.

While Usyk retained his titles via ninth-round stoppage, there was controversy surrounding the events of the fifth round, when Usyk dropped to the canvas following a punch from Dubois that was controversially ruled a low blow by referee Luis Pabon. Accordingly, Usyk was given a maximum of five minutes to recover, but despite declaring he was ready to continue, Pabon urged Usyk to take more time out. Usyk ultimately used three minutes and forty-five seconds before the fight resumed. Usyk forced Dubois to take a knee in the eighth round and again in the ninth round, where he was counted out. According to CompuBox stats, Usyk had outlanded Dubois in every round of the fight, landing 88 of 359 punches thrown (24.5%) to Dubois' 47 of 290 (16.2%). Dubois failed to land double digits in any round of the fight.

Debate subsequently followed regarding the fifth round low blow as many observers felt it should actually have been ruled a legal punch and thus potentially resulted in a KO victory for Dubois. In his post-fight interview, Dubois opined: "I didn't think that was a low blow. I thought that landed, and I’ve been cheated out of victory tonight.” However, Usyk's promoter Alex Krassyuk argued "The belly button is the line. Anything low of that is a low blow." This argument was echoed by others including boxers Tony Bellew and Liam Smith.

=== Undisputed heavyweight champion ===
==== Usyk vs. Fury ====
Usyk faced WBC champion Tyson Fury for the undisputed heavyweight title in Riyadh, Saudi Arabia. The fight contract signing was announced on 29 September 2023, whilst on 16 November 2023 the fight was officially scheduled for 17 February 2024. The total purse was reported to be worth around $150 million (£116 million), with Fury being guaranteed 70% of the purse, or £81.2 million (around $105 million), while Usyk was guaranteed $45 million. On 2 February, it was announced the fight would not be taking place on the 17th as Fury had sustained a cut in training. The fight was rescheduled to 18 May in Saudi Arabia. Usyk told the BBC that he missed the birth of his child while training in Spain and that he would return to Ukraine to see his family before resuming training for the rescheduled fight.

On 18 May, in a historic bout, Usyk defeated Fury via split decision to become the first undisputed heavyweight champion of the four belt era and the first undisputed heavyweight champion in 24 years. The opening rounds of the fight were closely contested, with Usyk applying constant pressure and landing power punches, while Fury found success with his jab, fighting off the back foot. From round 4, Fury became increasingly dominant, appearing to hurt Usyk with uppercuts in round 6. However, in the later rounds Usyk began to mount a comeback, particularly in a dramatic ninth round where he was able to badly hurt Fury with a series of punches, scoring a knockdown near the end of the round as Fury fell into the ropes. Although Fury was able to recover and attempted to rally, the judges ultimately awarded Usyk the split decision victory with scores of 115–112, 113–114, and 114–113.

Usyk broke down in tears in the ring after his victory was announced and dedicated it to his family, his team, and the people of Ukraine. After the fight, Fury commented: "I believe he won a few of the rounds but I won the majority of them … His country's at war, so people are siding with the country at war, but make no mistake, I won that fight … I'll be back. I've got a rematch clause." Fury raised the possibility of a rematch "in October", and eventually declared: "Happy New Year!" Usyk responded to Fury, stating, "If he wants, I'm ready for a rematch." Usyk supposedly suffered a broken jaw from the bout and went to the hospital after his press conference. Although, Usyk did not break his jaw. Fury was given a one week medical suspension following the fight. CompuBox suggested Usyk had landed 170 of 407 punches (41.8%) compared to Fury's 157 of 496 (31.7%).

==== Usyk vs. Fury II ====
Usyk and Fury were expected to meet in a rematch in October 2024 at Kingdom Arena in Riyadh, Saudi Arabia. On 29 May 2024 it was announced that the rematch was scheduled for 21 December 2024. The total purse for the rematch was reportedly worth $190–191 million (£150 million). While the purse split was not disclosed, it was speculated to be either 55/45 or 60/40 in favor of Usyk, which would guarantee him $105–114 million. However, Alexander Krassyuk denied these speculations: "We do not have a specific purse distribution. We have certain agreements: Tyson Fury has agreements with the organizers, and Oleksandr Usyk has agreements with the organizers." On 25 June, Usyk announced that he was vacating the IBF heavyweight title. This was to allow the Anthony Joshua versus Daniel Dubois fight in September to have the vacant title on the line. In December 2024 before the fight, Fury stated that Usyk was the best boxer in the world.

Usyk won the bout by unanimous decision with all three ringside judges scoring it 116–112. The fight was just as competitive as the first encounter. By the end of the fight, neither boxer was particularly hurt. Usyk landed with some stinging shots which pushed Fury back, while Fury landed some hard shots to head and body. A few times in the fight Fury turned southpaw. He tried to lean on Usyk and weigh him down, but Usyk did well to fight him off and keep him at a distance. He used his footwork to move strategically around the ring.

According to CompuBox, Usyk landed 179 punches out of 423 (42.3% accuracy), while Fury connected on 144 punches of 509 (28.3%). Usyk outlanded Fury in rounds 2–3 and 5–12; Fury outlanded Usyk in the fourth (11 punches to 10), while the opening round was even (six punches each). Usyk also connected on more power punches in seven rounds out of twelve, including the first round, while the last round was even (11 shots each). Writers from ESPN, The Independent, The New York Times, MMA Fighting, CBS Sports, The Sporting News and Bad Left Hook all had Usyk winning, with scores ranging from 115–113 to 117–111.

Fury felt he did enough to win the rematch. His promoter Frank Warren was shocked at the scorecards. He brought the scorecard sheet into the ring. 7 out of the 12 rounds were all scored unanimously for Usyk on all three judges cards. Prior to speaking to the reporters, Warren showed Fury the scorecards, which led Fury and his team to exit the ring and make their way to the dressing room. Warren said, "I showed it to him, I’m dumbfounded. They gave him four rounds out of 12, which is impossible. I’ve been around a long time, and I know I’m biased, but one judge didn’t give him any rounds from six onwards. Not one round. How can that be? Same with another judge, he gave him one round out of the last six, and the same here with this guy. It’s crazy." Usyk spoke with respect towards Fury in the post-fight ring interviews, "I very respect this guy because I think he's very tough .. Tyson Fury makes me strong. Tyson is a great opponent. Big man. He's a good man. Tyson, a lot of talk, but it's just show." Usyk felt the rematch was easier than the first. Despite being absent in the ring following the fight, Fury attended the post-fight press conference. He said, "More serious … I thought I won the fight again … I was on the front foot the entire time." When you don't get the knockout, this is what can happen." Heading into the final round, Fury was confident he was ahead. Following the fight, Usyk held aloft a sword in the ring belonging to 17th century Cossack warrior and leader Ivan Mazepa. The sword had been flown in especially from a museum in Ukraine.

==== Usyk vs. Dubois II ====
On 12 March 2025, Sky Sports reported that Usyk was in talks to fight Daniel Dubois in a rematch, for the undisputed heavyweight title. Alexander Krassyuk mentioned Wembley Stadium as an option for the venue. On 13 March, WBO president Gustavo Olivieri ordered for Usyk to make a mandatory defence against interim WBO champion Joseph Parker. Both parties were given 30 days to negotiate a deal before purse bids are called. On 4 April, Dubois told Ring Magazine the priority was to fight Usyk in July. He did not rule out fighting Parker or Derek Chisora. The IBF stated they would grant an exception for Dubois vs. Usyk, however if the fight did not materialise, then Chisora would be called as mandatory. On 10 April, the WBO received a petition to allow Dubois vs. Usyk to take place for the undisputed title.

On 27 April, the rematch between Usyk and Dubois (22–2, 21 KOs) was announced for the undisputed heavyweight title at Wembley Stadium in London on 19 July 2025. WBO president Gustavo Olivier explained his organisations decision to allow the unification fight as it allowed the heavyweight division to once again crown an undisputed champion. Parker would be next called as mandatory however, once the fight is over. The morning after the fight was announced, the two had their first face-off on the field of Wembley Stadium. Words were exchanged, leading to Dubois shoving Usyk, before security intervened. Usyk called it a sign of weakness on Dubois' part. With only four weeks before the fight, Usyk's long-time promoter Alex Krassyuk posted on social media and announced his promotion and Usyk had parted ways after 12 years. Some within boxing media speculated whether this meant the Dubois fight would be his last. Within 24 hours after they went on sale, more than 60,000 tickets were sold. By the end of June, 78,000 had been sold. Warren stated when 84,000 have sold, an increase to 94,000 would be applied. Usyk weighed a career-high 227.3 pounds and Dubois weighed 243.8 pounds, 10 pounds heavier than what he weighed in first fight.

There was heavy rain on the day but there was still a crowd of around 90,000 to watch the fight. In an impressive display of skill, Usyk dispatched Dubois in their rematch, securing a knockout in the fifth round of a one-sided contest. With this victory, Usyk once again unified the heavyweight division, earning the title of undisputed champion for the second time in his career. In the opening round, Usyk showcased a sharp jab, establishing control early in the fight. However, by the second round, Dubois rebounded effectively, gaining a slight advantage. In Round 3, Dubois was briefly rattled by a powerful left hook, but Usyk's intelligent footwork effectively prevented Dubois from finding any opportunities to retaliate. In the fifth round, Usyk first sent Dubois to the canvas with a right hook to the temple. After Dubois returned to his feet, in the next sequence Usyk delivered the decisive knockout with a flush left hook. Usyk joked that this left hook was called Ivan, "Ivan is a Ukrainian name. Ivan is a big guy who lives in a village and works for his family. It's a hard punch, Ivan." After being dropped the second time, Dubois rose to his knees, but allowed himself to be counted out by referee Mike Griffin. The towel was also thrown in towards the end of the count. At the time of stoppage, the judges scorecards read 40–36, 39–37 and 39–37, in favour of Usyk. According to CompuBox, Usyk landed 57 of 153 punches thrown (37.3%) and Dubois landed 35 of his 179 thrown (19.6%). When asked about his age and coming towards the end of his career, Usyk responded, "Thirty-eight is a young guy, 38 is only the start."

The BBC reported that "Usyk excelled in all areas - escaping Dubois' attacks with slick footwork, returning with crisp shots on the counter and displaying pure heavyweight power." The victory over Dubois made Usyk the second man to be a two-time undisputed heavyweight champion, after Muhammad Ali. According to the BBC, it meant Usyk was now certainly "the standout heavyweight of his generation." Immediately after the fight, Usyk rejected the suggestion he might now retire, naming Tyson Fury, Anthony Joshua, Joseph Parker and Derek Chisora as possible opponents in his next fight.

==== Vacating WBO title ====
On 24 July 2025, the WBO officially re-ordered Usyk to make a mandatory defence against interim champion Joseph Parker. According to Dave Higgins, Parker's long-time manager, as of 1 August, there has not been any negotiations for a fight. On 14 August, Frank Warren stated that Usyk requested an extension because of an injury. On 7 September, the WBO provided Usyk with a 90-day extension, but determined that he must compete against the victor of the Parker vs. Fabio Wardley fight next, which was announced the day before.

On 17 October, it was reported that Usyk had decided to extend his boxing career beyond 2026, after originally stating his plans to retire after one more fight. He ruled out fighting Moses Itauma in his next fight. He aims to retire at the age of 41, after which he plans on establishing a sports academy to train others. He later confirmed he wanted two or three more fights. On 30 October, Frank Warren stated that discussions had commenced for Usyk to defend his title against Fabio Wardley (20–0–1, 19 KOs). He mentioned that if an agreement cannot be reached, the fight will proceed to purse bids. On 17 November 2025, Usyk vacated the WBO title, which allowed Wardley to be elevated to full championship status. The WBO referred to Usyk's decision to relinquish the title as a "respectful pause" rather than a farewell, recognizing his accomplishments in boxing. President Gustavo Olivieri also acknowledged Usyk's contributions to the sport and his standing as a Super Champion.

=== Unified heavyweight champion ===
On 1 December, it was revealed that Usyk was considering a fight against former WBC heavyweight champion Deontay Wilder (44–4–1, 43 KOs) in 2026. Wilder's manager Shelly Finkel was open to negotiations if an offer was received. On 11 December, Wilder confirmed that negotiations had begun for a potential fight. The fight was loosely discussed in 2022, before Usyk became undisputed champion. According to Egis Klimas, the fight would likely take place during Spring on the West Coast. On choosing to fight Wilder, Klimas explained, “Wilder is one of the best names Oleksandr didn't face yet. He's still in good shape, and he's still a fighter, so he's interesting. And as well, it's the United States.” However, Wilder opted to fight Derek Chisora instead.

==== Usyk vs. Verhoeven ====
Usyk defended his WBC heavyweight title against former kickboxing heavyweight world champion Rico Verhoeven on 23 May 2026 in Giza, Egypt. Because Verhoeven only had one professional boxing match in 2014 he was not ranked by any sanctioning body despite his experience as a long-time Glory Heavyweight Champion. The WBA stated that if Usyk won, then the bout would count as a successful defence of his WBA (Super) belt, however the title would not be on the line for Verhoeven. The IBF stated if Usyk lost then the IBF belt would be declared vacant, should Usyk win then they would order a mandatory defence within 180 days. Verhoeven lost by a controversial TKO in the 11th round where the referee stepped in and waved off the fight despite the bell for the round having already rung. Two judges had it 95–95 while a third had it 96–94 for Verhoeven at the time of the stoppage. Had the fight not been stopped Usyk would probably have won the 11th round 10–8 because he knocked down Verhoeven, and would have been up on two scorecards by 105–103 and tied on the other at 104. After the fight, WBC mandatory challenger Agit Kabayel entered the ring and called for a title bout with Usyk, suggesting that it could be held in a German stadium. Usyk, who had previously said he might have two more fights after Verhoeven, replied that he was ready to face Kabayel.

==== Vacating WBA, WBC and IBF titles ====
On 26 June 2026, Usyk announced that he would vacate his WBA, WBC and IBF heavyweight titles. He said that he wanted to make the belts available for other contenders, while also stating that he had not retired from boxing. He said "Friends, I'm leaving the belts but not the sport because I still have my last dance." Usyk had repeatedly stated a desire for his last fight to be against former WBC heavyweight champion Deontay Wilder (45–4–1, 43 KOs) in the United States. After negotiations, in October, Wilder's manager Shelly Finkel said, “Usyk asked for more money than Zuffa or Turki (Alalshikh) wanted to pay,” meaning the fight was no longer being explored.

On 30 October 2026, his advisor Serhii Lapin said that Usyk was planning to move down to fight at cruiserweight again versus unified WBA and WBO cruiserweight champion David Benavidez (32–0, 26 KO) in 2027. The plan is to become a two-time undisputed champion at cruiserweight. Benavidez is scheduled to fight WBC titleholder Michał Cieślak in December, in a three-belt unification. The IBF title is vacant. A fight between the two was discussed in June 2026. Benavidez was open to fighting Usyk at heavyweight. He said it would be a great opportunity and would add respect to his name. In May 2026, David's father Jose said the fight would be legendary, and his son's greatest challenge.

== Fighting style and training ==
Usyk is known for his "sublime" footwork, his ability to control the pace of a fight, and his high punch output. His mental strength and ring craft have also been praised. Former world champion Shannon Briggs noted that Usyk's standard of conditioning "changed the game" in the heavyweight division. Briggs stated, "[in the] twelfth round he’s strong as in the first round. He’s throwing punches like it’s the first round. No one has ever done that in the history of boxing."

While training for a fight, Usyk spars 15 rounds of three-and-a-half minutes with 20 seconds' rest, facing a new opponent each round, eventually accumulating 250 rounds of sparring in camp. To improve stamina and control breathing, he swims laps in the pool for over five hours a session.

== Personal life ==
Usyk is married and has four children. They live in Kyiv, Ukraine. He practices multiple martial arts outside of boxing; including Jiu-Jitsu, Sambo, and Judo. Usyk is an Orthodox Christian.

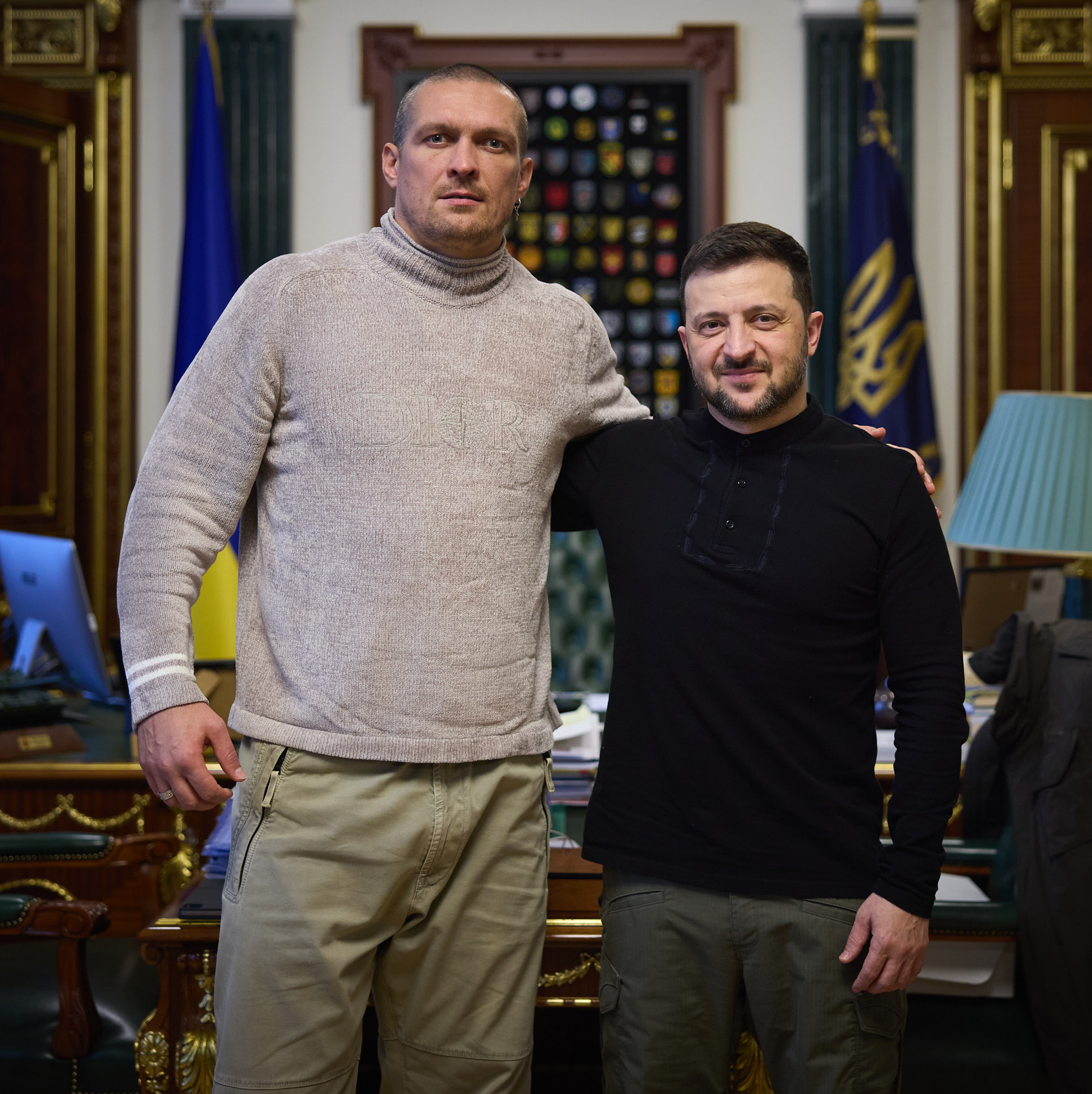
Usyk with President Volodymyr Zelenskyy on New Year's Eve 2024

In 2020, Usyk became a postgraduate student in the Psychology Department of Kharkiv National University of Internal Affairs, receiving his master's degree. In March 2025, he successfully defended his dissertation in law and was awarded the degree of Doctor of Philosophy in Law.

In February 2022, Usyk made a substitute appearance for the Ukrainian Premier League team FC Polissya Zhytomyr. In 2023, Usyk signed a one-year professional contract with the club and was given the number 17. Usyk said he intends to play football after he retires from boxing.

Usyk participated in a charity football match in Portugal on 15 September 2025. The "Legends Charity Game" was held at Estádio José Alvalade in Lisbon and featured a roster of former Premier League stars, including Edwin van der Sar, Petr Čech, John Terry, and Michael Owen, as well as international icons such as Carles Puyol, Alessandro Del Piero, Henrik Larsson, Cafu, Roberto Carlos, and Kaká. Rasmus Sojmark, founder and CEO of Sport Global, highlighted the importance of Usyk's participation, noting that his request to play was readily accepted. Usyk's involvement was intended to promote the Usyk Foundation, which provides support to communities in Ukraine and the Ukrainian army. Usyk played as a substitute for 17 minutes of the match. The match concluded with a score of 4–1 in favor of Portugal Legends.

In 2026 Usyk relaunched his Usyk17 Promotions, a Ukrainian boxing promotion company he founded in 2020, whose operations were interrupted by the war in Ukraine. The promotion is intended to boost the development of the next generation of Ukrainian boxers.

=== Political views ===
In April 2014, after the annexation of Crimea by the Russian Federation, Usyk declared he would never exchange his Ukrainian citizenship for Russian citizenship. In 2016, he said that he often visits family in Crimea; that he does not like to talk politics because people take words out of context; that in Russia he has many fans; and that he does not wish to divide people, "because we are Slavs". Afterwards, whenever pressed on the question, Usyk often replied "Crimea belongs to God". In May 2020, Usyk was listed on the Myrotvorets website for "repeating the Kremlin's statements [that Russia and Ukraine are] one nation, rejecting Russian aggression and denying the independence of Ukrainian Orthodoxy from Russian control (the aggressor country) of the Russian Orthodox Church, they have sided with the traitors of Ukraine". However, in September 2022 Usyk said that Crimea "was, is and will be" Ukrainian, and that it had been taken away forcefully from Ukraine.

When Russia invaded Ukraine in February 2022, Usyk called on Russian president Vladimir Putin to stop the invasion. A few days later, Usyk—along with fellow boxer Vasiliy Lomachenko and MMA champion Yaroslav Amosov—travelled back to Ukraine to join the country's territorial defense forces. Usyk took part in armed patrols in Kyiv. Usyk said that Russian soldiers broke into his empty house in Vorzel and ransacked it.

In late March, Usyk was given permission to leave Ukraine to train for his rematch with Anthony Joshua. He said that he did not want to leave, but that he visited wounded Ukrainian soldiers who told him he could help his country more by representing it internationally. In November, after Ukrainian Armed Forces liberated Kherson, Usyk posted a message online saying: "Donetsk is Ukraine. Luhansk is Ukraine. Zaporizhzhia is Ukraine. Crimea is Ukraine. Kherson is Ukraine. Glory to Ukraine. Glory to ZSU".

Usyk has received support in opinion polling for the next Ukrainian presidential election, with one poll indicating that as much as 6% of Ukrainians consider him their first choice for president. Usyk has declined having any aspirations to run for president of Ukraine.

== Professional boxing record ==
25 fights	25 wins	0 losses
By knockout	16	0
By decision	9	0

No.	Result	Record	Opponent	Type	Round, time	Date	Location	Notes
25	Win	25–0	Rico Verhoeven	TKO	11 (12), 2:59	23 May 2026	Pyramids of Giza, Giza, Egypt	Retained WBA (Super), WBC, and The Ring heavyweight titles
24	Win	24–0	Daniel Dubois	KO	5 (12), 1:52	19 Jul 2025	Wembley Stadium, London, England	Retained WBA (Super), WBC, WBO, IBO, and The Ring heavyweight titles; Won IBF heavyweight title
23	Win	23–0	Tyson Fury	UD	12	21 Dec 2024	Kingdom Arena, Riyadh, Saudi Arabia	Retained WBA (Super), WBC, WBO, IBO, and The Ring heavyweight titles
22	Win	22–0	Tyson Fury	SD	12	18 May 2024	Kingdom Arena, Riyadh, Saudi Arabia	Retained WBA (Super), IBF, WBO, IBO, and The Ring heavyweight titles; Won WBC heavyweight title
21	Win	21–0	Daniel Dubois	KO	9 (12), 1:48	26 Aug 2023	Wrocław Stadium, Wrocław, Poland	Retained WBA (Super), IBF, WBO, IBO, and The Ring heavyweight titles
20	Win	20–0	Anthony Joshua	SD	12	20 Aug 2022	King Abdullah Sports City, Jeddah, Saudi Arabia	Retained WBA (Super), IBF, WBO, and IBO heavyweight titles; Won vacant The Ring heavyweight title
19	Win	19–0	Anthony Joshua	UD	12	25 Sep 2021	Tottenham Hotspur Stadium, London, England	Won WBA (Super), IBF, WBO, and IBO heavyweight titles
18	Win	18–0	Derek Chisora	UD	12	31 Oct 2020	Wembley Arena, London, England	Won WBO Inter-Continental heavyweight title
17	Win	17–0	Chazz Witherspoon	RTD	7 (12), 3:00	12 Oct 2019	Wintrust Arena, Chicago, Illinois, US	
16	Win	16–0	Tony Bellew	KO	8 (12), 2:00	10 Nov 2018	Manchester Arena, Manchester, England	Retained WBA (Super), WBC, IBF, WBO, and The Ring cruiserweight titles
15	Win	15–0	Murat Gassiev	UD	12	21 Jul 2018	Olympic Stadium, Moscow, Russia	Retained WBC and WBO cruiserweight titles; Won WBA (Super), IBF and vacant The Ring cruiserweight titles; World Boxing Super Series: cruiserweight final
14	Win	14–0	Mairis Briedis	MD	12	27 Jan 2018	Arēna Rīga, Riga, Latvia	Retained WBO cruiserweight title; Won WBC cruiserweight title; World Boxing Super Series: cruiserweight semi-final
13	Win	13–0	Marco Huck	TKO	10 (12), 2:12	9 Sep 2017	Max-Schmeling-Halle, Berlin, Germany	Retained WBO cruiserweight title; World Boxing Super Series: cruiserweight quarter-final
12	Win	12–0	Michael Hunter	UD	12	8 Apr 2017	MGM National Harbor, Oxon Hill, Maryland, US	Retained WBO cruiserweight title
11	Win	11–0	Thabiso Mchunu	TKO	9 (12), 1:53	17 Dec 2016	The Forum, Inglewood, California, US	Retained WBO cruiserweight title
10	Win	10–0	Krzysztof Głowacki	UD	12	17 Sep 2016	Ergo Arena, Gdańsk, Poland	Won WBO cruiserweight title
9	Win	9–0	Pedro Rodriguez	TKO	7 (12), 1:57	12 Dec 2015	Palace of Sports, Kyiv, Ukraine	Retained WBO Inter-Continental cruiserweight title
8	Win	8–0	Johnny Muller	TKO	3 (12), 2:59	29 Aug 2015	Palace of Sports, Kyiv, Ukraine	Retained WBO Inter-Continental cruiserweight title
7	Win	7–0	Andrey Knyazev	TKO	8 (10), 2:24	18 Apr 2015	Palace of Sports, Kyiv, Ukraine	Retained WBO Inter-Continental cruiserweight title
6	Win	6–0	Danie Venter	TKO	9 (10), 2:29	13 Dec 2014	Palace of Sports, Kyiv, Ukraine	Retained WBO Inter-Continental cruiserweight title
5	Win	5–0	Daniel Bruwer	TKO	7 (10), 2:55	4 Oct 2014	Arena Lviv, Lviv, Ukraine	Won vacant WBO interim Inter-Continental cruiserweight title
4	Win	4–0	Cesar David Crenz	KO	4 (8), 2:19	31 May 2014	Sports Palace, Odesa, Ukraine	
3	Win	3–0	Ben Nsafoah	KO	3 (8), 1:43	26 Apr 2014	König Pilsener Arena, Oberhausen, Germany	
2	Win	2–0	Epifanio Mendoza	TKO	4 (6), 2:10	7 Dec 2013	Ice Arena TEC Terminal, Brovary, Ukraine	
1	Win	1–0	Felipe Romero	TKO	5 (6), 1:36	9 Nov 2013	Palace of Sports, Kyiv, Ukraine	

== World Series of Boxing record ==
6 fights	6 wins	0 losses
By knockout	2	0
By decision	4	0

No.	Result	Record	Opponent	Type	Round, time	Date	Location	Notes
6	Win	6–0	Mihai Nistor	UD	5	10 May 2013	Saryarka Velodrome, Astana, Kazakhstan	
5	Win	5–0	Matteo Modugno	TKO	2 (5), 1:57	13 Apr 2013	Casinò di Campione, Campione d'Italia, Italy	
4	Win	4–0	Magomedrasul Majidov	UD	5	22 Mar 2013	Palace of Sports, Kyiv, Ukraine	
3	Win	3–0	Joe Joyce	UD	5	1 Mar 2013	York Hall, London, England	
2	Win	2–0	Eric Brechlin	TKO	3 (5), 1:30	1 Feb 2013	ACCO International Exhibition Center, Kyiv, Ukraine	
1	Win	1–0	Junior Fa	UD	5	11 Jan 2013	ACCO International Exhibition Center, Kyiv, Ukraine	

== Titles in boxing ==
=== Major world titles ===
- WBA (Super) cruiserweight champion (200 lbs)
- WBC cruiserweight champion (200 lbs)
- IBF cruiserweight champion (200 lbs)
- WBO cruiserweight champion (200 lbs)
- WBA (Super) heavyweight champion (200+ lbs)
- WBC heavyweight champion (200+ lbs)
- IBF heavyweight champion (200+ lbs) (2x)
- WBO heavyweight champion (200+ lbs)

=== The Ring magazine titles ===
- The Ring cruiserweight champion (200 lbs)
- The Ring heavyweight champion (200+ lbs)

=== Minor world titles ===
- IBO heavyweight champion (200+ lbs)

=== Regional/International titles ===
- WBO interim Inter-Continental cruiserweight champion (200 lbs)
- WBO Inter-Continental cruiserweight champion (200 lbs)
- WBO Inter-Continental heavyweight champion (200+ lbs)

=== Undisputed titles ===
- Undisputed cruiserweight champion (Note: First and only undisputed cruiserweight champion of the four-belt era.)
- Undisputed heavyweight champion (Note: First and only undisputed heavyweight champion of the four-belt era.) (2x)

=== Honorary titles ===
- WBA Man of Triumph Gold champion
- WBC Diamond cruiserweight champion
- WBO Super cruiserweight champion
- WBO Super heavyweight champion
- WBC cruiserweight champion-in-recess
- WBC Undisputed I champion
- Riyadh Season Undisputed heavyweight champion
- WBC Rumble in the Jungle champion

=== Commemorative belts ===
- WBC "King of the Nile" commemorative belt
- WBC "Rumble in the Jungle 50th Anniversary" commemorative belt
- WBC Undisputed Heavyweight commemorative belt

== Sporting achievements ==
=== Professional ===
- 2024–2026 WBC World Heavyweight Champion (over 90.72 kg)
- 2022 – The Ring World Heavyweight Champion (over 90.72 kg)
- 2021–2025 WBO World Heavyweight Champion (over 90.72 kg)
- 2021–2026 WBA (Super) World Heavyweight Champion (over 90.72 kg)
- 2021–2024, 2025–2026 IBF World Heavyweight Champion (over 90.72 kg)
- 2021–2026 IBO World Heavyweight Champion (over 90.72 kg)
- 2018–2019 WBC World Cruiserweight Champion (up to 90.72 kg)
- 2018–2019 WBA (Super) World Cruiserweight Champion (up to 90.72 kg)
- 2018–2019 IBF World Cruiserweight Champion (up to 90.72 kg)
- 2018–2019 The Ring World Champion in the cruiserweight division (up to 90.72 kg)
- 2016–2019 WBO World Champion in the cruiserweight division (up to 90.72 kg)

=== Professional regional ===
- 2014–2016 — WBO Intercontinental cruiserweight champion (up to 90.72 kg)
- 2020–2021 —WBO Intercontinental heavyweight champion (over 90.72 kg)

=== Semi-professional ===
- 2013 — The Ukrainian Otamans’ Silver Cup from the 2012–2013 WSB season
- 2013 — Individual standings for the 2012–2013 WSB season

=== International amateur ===
- 2012 — Gold medallist at the XXX Olympic Games in the heavyweight category (up to 91 kg)
- 2011 — World heavyweight champion (up to 91 kg)
- 2009 — Bronze medallist at the World Championships in the heavyweight division (up to 91 kg)
- 2008 — European light-heavyweight champion (up to 81 kg)
- 2006 — Bronze medallist at the European Championships in the middleweight division (up to 75 kg)

=== Regional amateur ===
- 2011 — Ukrainian heavyweight champion (up to 91 kg)
- 2010 — Ukrainian heavyweight champion (up to 91 kg)
- 2009 — Ukrainian heavyweight champion (up to 91 kg)
- 2006 — Ukrainian middleweight champion (up to 75 kg)

=== Loss of the title of undisputed world champion ===
On 18 November 2025, Oleksandr Usyk lost his status as undisputed world champion after voluntarily vacating the WBO belt. Having relinquished the WBO belt, Usyk retained his WBA Super, WBC and IBF titles. The new full WBO champion was the British boxer Fabio Wardley, who had previously been the interim champion.

== Awards ==
- Boxing Writers Association of America (BWAA) Sugar Ray Robinson Award Fighter of the Year: 2018, 2024
- BWAA Muhammad Ali–Joe Frazier Award Fight of the Year: 2024
- BWAA John McCain-Bill Crawford Courage Award: 2022
- The Ring magazine Fighter of the Year: 2018, 2024
- The Ring magazine Event of the Year: 2021, 2024
- The Ring magazine Round of the Year: 2024
- Muhammad Ali Trophy: 2018
- ESPN Fighter of the Year: 2018, 2024
- ESPN Fight of the Year: 2024
- WBC Fighter of the Year: 2018, 2024
- WBC Knockout of the Year: 2018, 2025
- WBC King Award: 2025
- WBA Fighter of the Year: 2018, 2024
- WBA Boxer of the Month: July 2018, September 2021
- IBF Fight of the Year: 2024
- WBO Fighter of the Year: 2022, 2024
- WBO Fight of the Year: 2022, 2024
- WBO Intercontinental Fighter of the Year: 2015
- Sports Illustrated Fighter of the Year: 2018, 2024
- Sports Illustrated Fight of the Year: 2024
- CBS Sports Fighter of the Year: 2018, 2024
- CBS Sports Fight of the Year: 2024
- Yahoo! Sports Fighter of the Year: 2018, 2024
- The Sporting News Fighter of the Year: 2018, 2024
- Bleacher Report Fighter of the Year: 2024
- Bleacher Report Breakout Fighter of the Year: 2016
- Los Angeles Daily News Fighter of the Year: 2018
- WBN Fighter of the Year: 2022, 2024
- WBN Fight of the Year: 2024
- WBN World Title Prospect of the Year: 2016
- The RING 8 Historical Award: 2018
- FanSided Fighter of the Year: 2018
- Boxing Insider Fighter of the Year: 2018, 2024
- Boxing News Fighter of the Year: 2024
- The Sweet Science (TSS) Fighter of the Year: 2018, 2024
- BoxingScene Fighter of the Year: 2018, 2024
- The Fight City Fighter of the Year: 2018, 2021
- The Fight City Performance of the Year: 2021
- The Queensberry Rules Fighter of the Year: 2018

=== National ===
==== Ukraine ====
- Merited Master of Sports of Ukraine
- Order of Merit, 1st Class: 2022
- Order of Liberty: 2024
- National Legend of Ukraine: 2024

== Viewership ==
=== Pay-per-view bouts ===
No.	Date	Fight	Country	Network	Buys	Source(s)
1	10 November 2018	Oleksandr Usyk vs. Tony Bellew	United Kingdom	Sky Box Office	819,000	
2	31 October 2020	Oleksandr Usyk vs. Derek Chisora	United Kingdom	Sky Box Office	1,059,000	
2	31 October 2020	Oleksandr Usyk vs. Derek Chisora	Ukraine	MEGOGO	100,000	
3	25 September 2021	Anthony Joshua vs. Oleksandr Usyk	United Kingdom	Sky Box Office	1,232,000	
4	22 August 2022	Oleksandr Usyk vs. Anthony Joshua II	United Kingdom	Sky Box Office	1,249,000	
5	26 August 2023	Oleksandr Usyk vs. Daniel Dubois	United Kingdom	TNT Sports Box Office	Undisclosed	
6	18 May 2024	Tyson Fury vs. Oleksandr Usyk	Worldwide	DAZN PPV, PPV.com, ESPN+ PPV, Sky Box Office, TNT Sports Box Office	1,500,000	
7	21 December 2024	Oleksandr Usyk vs. Tyson Fury II	Worldwide	DAZN PPV, Sky Box Office, TNT Sports Box Office	Undisclosed	
8	19 July 2025	Oleksandr Usyk vs. Daniel Dubois II	Worldwide	DAZN PPV	Undisclosed	
Total sales					5,959,000+	

=== Ukraine ===
No.	Date	Fight	Country	Network	Viewers	Source
1	18 April 2015	Oleksandr Usyk vs. Andrey Knyazyev	Ukraine	Inter	3,600,000	
2	29 August 2015	Oleksandr Usyk vs. Johnny Muller	Ukraine	Inter	4,500,000	
3	21 July 2018	Oleksandr Usyk vs. Murat Gassiev	Ukraine	Inter	4,000,000	
4	20 August 2022	Oleksandr Usyk vs. Anthony Joshua II	Ukraine	MEGOGO	1,500,000	
5	19 July 2025	Oleksandr Usyk vs. Daniel Dubois II	Ukraine	MEGOGO	Undisclosed	
Total viewership				13,600,000		

== Filmography ==
Key
†	Denotes films that have not yet been released

=== Film ===
Year	Title	Role	Notes	Ref.
2016	The Fight Rules	Professional Boxer		
2018	The Stolen Princess	“Sholom” (Troyeschyna gangster)		
2024	A Tale As Old As Time: Ring of Fire	Himself	Promotional short film	
2024	Reignited - Can’t Get You Out of My Head	Himself	Promotional short film	
2024	Undisputed	Himself	Documentary film	
2025	The Smashing Machine	Igor Vovchanchyn		

=== Video games ===
Year	Title	Role	Ref.
2024	Undisputed	Himself	

=== Podcasts ===
Air Date	Title	Notes	Ref
20 January 2025	The Ring Podcast	Exclusive guest	

== See also ==
- List of WBA world champions
- List of WBC world champions
- List of IBF world champions
- List of WBO world champions
- List of IBO world champions
- List of The Ring world champions
- List of world cruiserweight boxing champions
- List of world heavyweight boxing champions
- List of undisputed world boxing champions
- Boxing at the 2012 Summer Olympics
- List of Olympic medalists in boxing

== Notes ==
Sporting positions
Regional boxing titles
New title	WBO Inter-Continental cruiserweight champion Interim title 4 October – December 2014; Promoted	Vacant
Vacant Title last held by Krzysztof Głowacki	WBO Inter-Continental cruiserweight champion December 2014 – 17 September 2016; Won world title	Vacant Title next held by Imre Szellő
Preceded by Derek Chisora	WBO Inter-Continental heavyweight champion 31 October 2020 – April 2021; Vacated	Vacant Title next held by Joseph Parker
Minor world boxing titles
Preceded by Anthony Joshua	IBO heavyweight champion 25 September 2021 – 26 June 2026; Vacated	Vacant
Major world boxing titles
Preceded by Krzysztof Głowacki	WBO cruiserweight champion 17 September 2016 – 5 June 2019; Vacated	Vacant Title next held by Krzysztof Głowacki
Preceded by Mairis Briedis	WBC cruiserweight champion 27 January 2018 – 4 June 2019; Vacated	Vacant Title next held by Ilunga Makabu
Preceded by Murat Gassiev	WBA cruiserweight champion Super title 21 July 2018 – 27 March 2019; Vacated	Vacant Title next held by Arsen Goulamirian
Preceded by Murat Gassiev	IBF cruiserweight champion 21 July 2018 – 15 June 2019; Vacated	Vacant Title next held by Yuniel Dorticos
Vacant Title last held by Yoan Pablo Hernández	The Ring cruiserweight champion 21 July 2018 – 16 October 2019; Vacated	Vacant Title next held by Mairis Briedis
Vacant Title last held by O'Neil Bell	Undisputed cruiserweight champion 21 July 2018 – 27 March 2019; Titles fragmented	Vacant
Preceded by Anthony Joshua	WBA heavyweight champion Super title 25 September 2021 – 26 June 2026; Vacated	Vacant
Preceded by Anthony Joshua	IBF heavyweight champion 25 September 2021 – 26 June 2024; Vacated	Succeeded by Daniel Dubois; Interim champion promoted
Preceded by Anthony Joshua	WBO heavyweight champion 25 September 2021 – 17 November 2025; Vacated	Succeeded by Fabio Wardley; Interim champion promoted
Vacant Title last held by Tyson Fury	The Ring heavyweight champion 20 August 2022 – present	Incumbent
Preceded by Tyson Fury	WBC heavyweight champion 18 May 2024 – 26 June 2026; Vacated	Succeeded by Agit Kabayel; Interim champion promoted
Vacant Title last held by Lennox Lewis	Undisputed heavyweight champion 18 May – 26 June 2024; Titles fragmented	Vacant Title next held by Himself
Preceded by Daniel Dubois	IBF heavyweight champion 19 July 2025 – 26 June 2026; Vacated	Vacant Title next held by Filip Hrgovic
Vacant Title last held by Himself	Undisputed heavyweight champion 19 July – 17 November 2025; Titles fragmented	Vacant
Awards
Previous: Vasiliy Lomachenko	The Ring Fighter of the Year; 2018	Next: Canelo Álvarez
Previous: Vasiliy Lomachenko	BWAA Fighter of the Year; 2018	Next: Canelo Álvarez
Previous: Naoya Inoue	The Ring Fighter of the Year; 2024	Next: Terence Crawford
Previous: O'Shaquie Foster vs. Eduardo Hernandez; Round 11	The Ring Round of the Year vs. Tyson Fury; Round 9; 2024	Next: Seiya Tsutsumi vs. Daigo Higa; Round 9
Previous: Naoya Inoue	BWAA Fighter of the Year; 2024	Next: Terence Crawford
Previous: Jaime Munguía vs. Sergiy Derevyanchenko	BWAA Fight of the Year vs. Tyson Fury; 2024	Next: Chris Eubank Jr vs. Conor Benn
Achievements
Preceded by Canelo Álvarez	The Ring pound for pound #1 boxer 7 May – 11 June 2022	Succeeded by Naoya Inoue
Preceded by Naoya Inoue	The Ring pound for pound #1 boxer 20 August 2022 – 29 July 2023	Succeeded by Terence Crawford
Preceded by Naoya Inoue	The Ring pound for pound #1 boxer 18 May 2024 – 15 September 2025	Succeeded by Terence Crawford
Preceded by Terence Crawford	The Ring pound for pound #1 boxer 24 December 2025 – 4 May 2026	Succeeded by Naoya Inoue
