= Ivan Senay =

Ukrainian boxer

Medal record

Representing Ukraine

Men's boxing

European Amateur Championships
Gold medal – first place	2008 Liverpool	Middleweight

Ivan Senay is a Ukrainian amateur boxer who won the gold medal at the 2008 European Amateur Boxing Championships in the middleweight division.

== European Amateur Championships ==
Senay represented Ukraine at the 2008 European Amateur Boxing Championships in Liverpool, England. He won a gold medal after beating Russia's Maxim Koptyakov 9:4 in the final.

=== European Championships results ===
2008 (as a Middleweight)

- Preliminary round - BYE
- Second round Defeated Mladen Manev (Bulgaria) 9:3
- Quarter Finals Defeated Istvan Szili (Hungary) 11:4
- Semi Finals Defeated Victor Cotiujanshiu (Moldova) 8:4
- Finals Defeated Maxim Koptyakov (Russia) 9:4
