= Thabiso Mchunu =

South African boxer (born 1988)

Personal information
- Nickname: The Rock
- Nationality: South African
- Born: 4 March 1988 (age 38) Ximba, KwaZulu-Natal, South Africa
- Height: 1.80 m (5 ft 11 in)
- Weight: Cruiserweight

Boxing career
- Reach: 184 cm (72 in)
- Stance: Southpaw

Boxing record
- Total fights: 31
- Wins: 23
- Win by KO: 13
- Losses: 8

Thabiso Mchunu (born 4 March 1988) is a South African professional boxer. He has challenged twice for a world title; first in 2016 for the WBO cruiserweight title. In 2022, he challenged for the WBC cruiserweight title.

== Professional career ==
=== Early career ===
Mchunu made his professional debut against Mzikayise Hlengwa on 28 July 2008 in Durban, South Africa. He won the fight on points after four rounds. After amassing a 3-0 record, Mchunu was booked to face Patrick Madzinga for the vacant South African cruiserweight title on 29 February 2008. He won the vacant title by a ninth-round technical knockout. Mchunu was scheduled to make his first title defense against Sean Santana on 11 July 2008. Santana retired from the fight at the end of the sixth round. After successfully making his first South African title defense, Mchunu was booked to fight Marciano Commey for the vacant WBA Pan African cruiserweight title on 10 October 2008 in Bloemfontein, South Africa. He won the fight by a first-round knockout. He made two more South African title defenses against Ruben Groenewald on 22 January 2009 and Daniel Bruwer on 5 November 2010, as well as a joint South African and Pan African title defense against Soon Botes on 15 May 2009.

After successfully beating Danie Venter by majority decision on 4 June 2011, Mchunu faced his first step-up in competition as he was booked to fight the 10-2 Zack Mwekassa on 24 October 2011, in Kempton Park, Gauteng. Mwekassa won the fight by a sixth-round technical knockout.

=== First cruiserweight title run ===
==== South African champion ====
Mchunu faced Danie Venter for the vacant African cruiserweight title on 10 November 2012. He won the fight by a fifth-round knockout. Venter was knocked down three times by the 1:52 minute mark, which forced the referee to stop the fight. Mchunu made his United States debut against Eddie Chambers on 3 August 2013, as the fight took place at the Mohegan Sun Arena in Montville, Connecticut. Mchunu won the fight by unanimous decision, with scores of 99-91, 99-91 and 99-93.

Mchunu was booked to face the 17-1 Olanrewaju Durodola for the vacant WBC–NABF cruiserweight title on 24 January 2014. He won the fight by unanimous decision, with scores of 98-91, 96-93 and 97-92. Mchunu made his first WBC-NABF title defense against Garrett Wilson on 20 September 2014. He won the fight by unanimous decision, with scores of 99-90, 96-93 and 98-91.

Mchunu returned to South Africa for his next bout, as he was booked to face Ilunga Makabu in a twelve-round WBC cruiserweight title eliminator bout on 16 May 2015 at the Convention Centre in KwaZulu-Natal, South Africa. Makabu won the fight by an eleventh-round knockout. Mchunu was leading slightly on the scorecards at the time of the stoppage, with scores of 96-95, 95-95 and 97-94. After suffering the second professional loss of his career, Mchunu was scheduled to face Boniface Kabore for the vacant WBA interim Pan African cruiserweight title on 20 May 2016 at the Convention Centre in KwaZulu-Natal, South Africa.

==== Mchunu vs. Usyk ====
Mchunu challenged the reigning WBO cruiserweight champion Oleksandr Usyk on the Bernard Hopkins vs. Joe Smith Jr. undercard on 17 December 2016. The bout took place at The Forum in Inglewood, California. The fight started out slow, causing the fans in attendance to boo with displeasure. The pace picked up after the first couple of rounds when Usyk began breaking down Mchunu, before knocking him out in the ninth round. Mchunu was outlanded 163 to 76 in total punches.

==== Mixed fortunes ====
Following the third loss of his professional career, Mchunu was scheduled to face Johnny Muller for the vacant African and South African cruiserweight titles on 10 June 2017. He thoroughly dominated Muller en-route to a unanimous decision victory, with all three judges awarding Mchunu a 120-108 scorecard. After he bounced back from his loss to Usyk, Mchunu was booked to challenge the WBC International and Continental Americas cruiserweight champion Constantin Bejenaru on 25 November 2017. Mchunu lost the fight by unanimous decision, with scores of 98-91, 97-92 and 97-92. Bejenaru dropped Mchunu with a left cross in the seventh round, but was unable to finish him.

Seven months later, Mchunu was booked to face Ričards Bolotņiks on 23 June 2018, in his return to South Africa, after losing both of his previous United States bouts. He won the fight by sixth-round technical knockout. Mchunu was next scheduled to fight Thomas Oosthuizen for the vacant African cruiserweight title on 1 November 2018. Despite coming into the fight as a favorite, Mchunu ended up losing the fight by majority decision. The two fought an immediate rematch on 8 December 2018, with his South African cruiserweight and Oosthuizen's African cruiserweight titles being on the line. Mchunu won the fight by unanimous decision, with scores of 118-111, 119-111 and 119-109.

=== Second cruiserweight title run ===
==== Mchunu vs. Shihepo ====
Mchunu faced the 36-fight veteran Willbeforce Shihepo on 20 October 2019, at the Time Square in Menlyn, South Africa. Shihepo retired from the bout at the end of the third round, thus awarding Mchunu a stoppage victory. Shihepo gave a surprising reason for his retirement from the fight however, stating: "I am hungry, I have no energy because I never had anything to eat".

==== Mchunu vs. Lebedev ====
Mchunu faced the former unified cruiserweight champion Denis Lebedev for the vacant WBC Silver cruiserweight title on 21 December 2019, at the Ivan Yarygin Sports Palace in Krasnoyarsk, Russia. The 40-year-old Lebedev had announced his retirement in July of the same year, but came out of it to fight Mchunu. His previous fight took place on November 24, 2018. Lebedev was ranked #9 by the WBC at cruiserweight. Mchunu won the fight by a wide unanimous decision, with scores of 119-108, 120-107 and 115-112. Lebedev subsequently announced his second retirement from the sport.

==== Mchunu vs. Tishchenko ====
Mchunu made his first WBC Silver title defense against the 2016 Olympic gold medalist Evgeny Tishchenko on 27 March 2021, at the RCC Boxing Academy in Yekaterinburg, Russia, in what was the WBC cruiserweight title eliminator as well. He won the fight by unanimous decision, with scores of 117-111, 117-111 and 119-109. By beating Tishchenko, Mchunu earned the status of mandatory challenger to the reigning WBC champion Ilunga Makabu, who handed Mchunu his second professional loss.

==== Mchunu vs. Makabu ====
Mchunu is scheduled to make his second world title challenge against the reigning WBC cruiserweight champion Ilunga Makabu on January 29, 2022, at the Packard Music Hall in Warren, Ohio. Makabu was ranked as the #2 cruiserweight in the world by The Ring magazine. The bout was independently broadcast on Fite TV by Don King promotions. Makabu won the fight by split decision. Two of the judge scored the bout in his favor (115–113 and 116–112), while the third judge scored it 115–113 for Mchunu. Many news outlets disagreed with the decision, as they had scored it in favor of Mchunu.

=== Later career ===
Mchunu lost to Muslim Gadzhimagomedov by unanimous decision in a 10 round contest at the International Boxing Centre Luzhniki in Moscow, Russia, on 31 January 2025.

== Professional boxing record ==
31 fights	23 wins	8 losses
By knockout	13	3
By decision	10	5

No.	Result	Record	Opponent	Type	Round, time	Date	Location	Notes
31	Loss	23–8	Muslim Gadzhimagomedov	UD	10	31 Jan 2025	International Boxing Centre Luzhniki, Moscow, Russia	
30	Loss	23–7	Yamil Alberto Peralta	SD	10	22 Mar 2024	Olive Convention Centre, Durban, South Africa	For WBC Silver cruiserweight title
29	Loss	23–6	Ilunga Makabu	SD	12	29 Jan 2022	Packard Music Hall, Warren, Ohio, U.S.	For WBC cruiserweight title
28	Win	23–5	Evgeny Tishchenko	UD	12	27 Mar 2021	RCC Boxing Academy, Yekaterinburg, Russia	Retained WBC Silver cruiserweight title
27	Win	22–5	Denis Lebedev	UD	12	21 Dec 2019	Ivan Yarygin Sports Palace, Krasnoyarsk, Russia	Won vacant WBC Silver cruiserweight title
26	Win	21–5	Willbeforce Shihepo	RTD	3 (12), 3:00	20 Oct 2019	Time Square, Menlyn, South Africa	
25	Win	20–5	Thomas Oosthuizen	UD	12	8 Dec 2018	Emperors Palace, Kempton Park, South Africa	Retained South African cruiserweight title; Won African cruiserweight title
24	Loss	19–5	Thomas Oosthuizen	MD	12	1 Sep 2018	Emperors Palace, Kempton Park, South Africa	For vacant African cruiserweight title
23	Win	19–4	Ricards Bolotniks	TKO	6 (10), 0:23	23 Jun 2018	Emperors Palace, Kempton Park, South Africa	
22	Loss	18–4	Constantin Bejenaru	UD	10	25 Nov 2017	Mohegan Sun Arena, Montville, Connecticut, U.S.	For WBC International and WBC Continental Americas cruiserweight titles
21	Win	18–3	Johnny Muller	UD	12	10 Jun 2017	Emperors Palace, Kempton Park, South Africa	Won vacant African and South African cruiserweight titles
20	Loss	17–3	Oleksandr Usyk	KO	9 (12), 1:53	17 Dec 2016	The Forum, Inglewood, California, U.S.	For WBO cruiserweight title
19	Win	17–2	Boniface Kabore	TKO	2 (12)	20 May 2016	Convention Centre, KwaZulu-Natal, South Africa	Won vacant WBA interim Pan African cruiserweight title
18	Loss	16–2	Ilunga Makabu	KO	11 (12), 1:56	16 May 2015	Convention Centre, KwaZulu-Natal, South Africa	
17	Win	16–1	Garrett Wilson	UD	10	20 Sep 2014	Foxwoods Resort Casino, Ledyard, Connecticut, U.S.	Retained WBC–NABF cruiserweight title
16	Win	15–1	Olanrewaju Durodola	UD	10	24 Jan 2014	Resorts Casino Hotel, Atlantic City, New Jersey, U.S.	Won vacant WBC–NABF cruiserweight title
15	Win	14–1	Eddie Chambers	UD	10	3 Aug 2013	Mohegan Sun Arena, Montville, Connecticut, U.S.	
14	Win	13–1	Danie Venter	KO	5 (12), 1:52	10 Nov 2012	Kempton Park, Gauteng, South Africa	Won vacant African cruiserweight title
13	Win	12–1	Flo Simba	TKO	1 (10), 2:46	22 Sep 2012	Kempton Park, Gauteng, South Africa	
12	Win	11–1	Flo Simba	TKO	1 (8), 2:53	16 Jun 2012	Kempton Park, Gauteng, South Africa	
11	Loss	10–1	Zack Mwekassa	TKO	6 (8), 1:45	24 Oct 2011	Kempton Park, Gauteng, South Africa	
10	Win	10–0	Danie Venter	MD	8	4 Jun 2011	Kempton Park, Gauteng, South Africa	
9	Win	9–0	Daniel Bruwer	UD	12	5 Nov 2010	Durban, KwaZulu-Natal, South Africa	Retained South African cruiserweight title
8	Win	8–0	Ruben Groenewald	TKO	4 (12), 1:31	22 Jan 2010	Bloemfontein, Free State, South Africa	Retained South African cruiserweight title
7	Win	7–0	Soon Botes	TKO	8 (12), 2:21	15 May 2009	Sasolburg, Free State, South Africa	Retained WBA Pan African and South African cruiserweight titles
6	Win	6–0	Marciano Commey	KO	1 (12), 0:32	10 Oct 2008	Bloemfontein, Free State, South Africa	Won vacant WBA Pan African cruiserweight title
5	Win	5–0	Sean Santana	RTD	6 (12), 3:00	11 Jul 2008	Johannesburg, Gauteng, South Africa	Retained South African cruiserweight title
4	Win	4–0	Patrick Madzinga	TKO	9 (12), 2:07	29 Feb 2008	Johannesburg, Gauteng, South Africa	Won vacant South African cruiserweight title
3	Win	3–0	Jacques Moussisi	TKO	1 (4)	11 Jan 2008	Welkom, Free State, South Africa	
2	Win	2–0	Kleinboy Maqashane	TKO	1 (4)	10 Nov 2007	Johannesburg, Gauteng, South Africa	
1	Win	1–0	Mzikayise Hlengwa	PTS	4	28 Jul 2007	Durban, KwaZulu-Natal, South Africa	
