= Danie Venter =

South African boxer (born 1979)

Personal information
- Full name: Daniel Jan "Danie" Venter
- Nationality: South African
- Born: 27 March 1979 (age 46); Pretoria, South Africa

Sport
- Sport: Boxing

Daniel Jan "Danie" Venter (born 27 March 1979) is a South African professional boxer who fought from 2003 to 2016. As an amateur, he competed in the men's light heavyweight event at the 2000 Summer Olympics.

== Professional boxing record ==
28 fights	20 wins	8 losses
By knockout	15	6
By decision	5	2

No.	Result	Record	Opponent	Type	Round, time	Date	Location	Notes
28	Loss	20–8	(Latvia) Mairis Briedis	TKO	2 (12), 2:24	21 Feb 2016	Arēna Rīga, Riga, Latvia	For vacant IBF Inter-Continental cruiserweight title
27	Win	20–7	(South Africa) Vusumzi Mlindwa	TKO	2 (6)	29 Jul 2015	Presley's Nightclub, Pretoria, South Africa	
26	Loss	19–7	(Ukraine) Oleksandr Usyk	TKO	9 (10), 2:29	13 Dec 2014	Palace of Sports, Kyiv, Ukraine	For WBO Inter-Continental cruiserweight title
25	Win	19–6	(Democratic Republic of the Congo) Big Ben Marcell Mulumba	TKO	3 (6)	10 Oct 2014	HTS Gardens Hall, Pretoria, South Africa	
24	Win	18–6	(Barbados) Shawn Cox	KO	1 (12)	21 Sep 2013	Heartfelt Arena, Pretoria, South Africa	Won vacant WBF cruiserweight title
23	Win	17–6	(Zimbabwe) Elvis Moyo	PTS	6	27 Jul 2013	Pretoria North Town Hall, Pretoria, South Africa	
22	Win	16–6	(Democratic Republic of the Congo) Nsitu Mbaya	TKO	1 (?)	1 Jun 2013	HTS School Hall, Pretoria, South Africa	
21	Loss	15–6	(South Africa) Thabiso Mchunu	KO	5 (12), 1:52	10 Nov 2012	Emperors Palace, Kempton Park, South Africa	For vacant African cruiserweight title; Super 8 "Last Man Standing" Tournament: Cruiserweight – final
20	Win	15–5	(Democratic Republic of the Congo) Zack Mwekassa	TKO	4 (10), 2:23	22 Sep 2012	Emperors Palace, Kempton Park, South Africa	Super 8 "Last Man Standing" Tournament: Cruiserweight – semi-final
19	Win	14–5	(South Africa) Daniel Bruwer	UD	8	16 Jun 2012	Emperors Palace, Kempton Park, South Africa	Super 8 "Last Man Standing" Tournament: Cruiserweight – quarter-final
18	Win	13–5	(Democratic Republic of the Congo) Alex Mbaya	TKO	1 (8)	21 Apr 2012	Birchwood Hotel, Boksburg, South Africa	
17	Win	12–5	(South Africa) Flo Simba	TKO	1 (8), 1:53	24 Sep 2011	Emperors Palace, Kempton Park, South Africa	
16	Loss	11–5	(South Africa) Thabiso Mchunu	MD	8	4 June 2011	Emperors Palace, Kempton Park, South Africa	
15	Win	11–4	(South Africa) Bully Muravha	KO	10 (10), 2:58	13 Feb 2011	Nasrec Indoor Arena, Johannesburg, South Africa	Won vacant Gauteng heavyweight title
14	Loss	10–4	(Democratic Republic of the Congo) Ilunga Makabu	TKO	6 (6)	30 Oct 2010	Klipriviersberg Recreation Centre, Johannesburg, South Africa	
13	Win	10–3	(Zimbabwe) Chamunorwa Gonorenda	UD	6	3 Sep 2010	Turfontein Race Course, Johannesburg, South Africa	
12	Win	9–3	(Republic of the Congo) Kali Kelembe	TKO	4 (6)	10 Jul 2010	Tuine High School Hall, Pretoria, South Africa	
11	Loss	8–3	(Hungary) Gyorgy Hidvegi	RTD	6 (12), 1:15	4 Nov 2006	Emperors Palace, Kempton Park, South Africa	For WBF cruiserweight title
10	Win	8–2	(South Africa) Earl Morais	TKO	1 (12), 1:55	29 Jul 2006	Emperors Palace, Kempton Park, South Africa	Won vacant South African cruiserweight title
9	Win	7–2	(Democratic Republic of the Congo) Toto Mubenga	UD	8	30 Mar 2006	Carnival City Casino, Brakpan, South Africa	
8	Win	6–2	(South Africa) Lulamile Khumalo	TKO	3 (6)	29 Jun 2004	Carousel Casino, Hammanskraal, South Africa	
7	Loss	5–2	(South Africa) Osborn Machimana	TKO	6 (8)	6 Feb 2004	Carnival City Casino, Brakpan, South Africa	
6	Loss	5–1	(South Africa) Anton Nel	SD	12	4 Oct 2003	Carnival City Casino, Brakpan, South Africa	For South African heavyweight title
5	Win	5–0	(Zimbabwe) Collice Mutizwa	KO	1 (4), 2:20	26 Jul 2003	(United Kingdom) The Pavilions, Plymouth, England	
4	Win	4–0	(United Kingdom) Derek McCafferty	PTS	4	21 Jun 2003	(United Kingdom) M.E.N. Arena, Manchester, England	
3	Win	3–0	(South Africa) Phillip Bekker	KO	1 (4)	31 May 2003	Carnival City Casino, Brakpan, South Africa	
2	Win	2–0	(South Africa) Johannes Mahlangu	KO	1 (6)	6 May 2003	Carousel Casino, Hammanskraal, South Africa	
1	Win	1–0	(South Africa) Jaco Van Dyk	TKO	1 (4)	1 Mar 2003	Carnival City Casino, Brakpan, South Africa	
