= Maxim Koptyakov =

Russian boxer

Medal record

Representing Russia

Men's boxing

European Games
Bronze medal – third place	2015 Baku	Middleweight

European Amateur Championships
Gold medal – first place	2011 Ankara	Middleweight
Silver medal – second place	2008 Liverpool	Middleweight

Maxim Valeryevich Koptyakov (Russian: Максим Валерьевич Коптяков) is a Russian amateur boxer who won the silver medal at the 2008 European Amateur Boxing Championships in the middleweight division.

== Russian national championships ==
Koptyakov won the 2008 middleweight Russian senior national championships beating Dmitriy Chudinov in the final 12-8.

== European Amateur Championships ==
Koptyakov represented Russia at the 2008 European Amateur Boxing Championships in Liverpool, England. He won silver losing to the Ukraine's Ivan Senay 9-4 in the final.

=== European Championships results ===
2008 (as a Middleweight)

- Preliminary round - BYE
- Second round Defeated Naim Terbunja (Sweden) 7-5
- Quarter Finals Defeated Mikalai Vesialou (Belarus) 12-3
- Semi Finals Defeated Eamon O'Kane (Ireland) 10-2
- Finals Lost to Ivan Senay (Ukraine) 4-9
