= Boxing at the 2015 European Games – Men's 75 kg =

Boxing competitions

Men's middleweight boxing at the 2015 European Games
- Venue: Baku Crystal Hall
- Date: 16–27 June
- Competitors: 24 from 24 nations

Medalists
gold medal	Michael O'Reilly	Ireland
silver medal	Xaybula Musalov	Azerbaijan
bronze medal	Maxim Koptyakov	Russia
bronze medal	Zoltán Harcsa	Hungary

The men's middleweight 75 kg boxing event at the 2015 European Games in Baku was held from 16 to 27 June at the Baku Crystal Hall.

== Results ==
=== Final ===
Final; 27 June
Michael O'Reilly (IRL)	3
Xaybula Musalov (AZE)	0

=== Top half ===
Round of 32; 16–17 June
Aleksandar Drenovak (SRB)	0
Salvatore Cavallaro (ITA)	3
Maxim Koptyakov (RUS)	3
Mike Steffensen (DEN)	0
Dmitri Tretyak (FIN)	3
Vít Král (CZE)	0
Sanjin Pol Vrgoč (CRO)	0
Michael O'Reilly (IRL)	3

Round of 16; 21 June
Anthony Fowler (GBR)	0
Salvatore Cavallaro (ITA)	3
Maxim Koptyakov (RUS)	3
Denis Radovan (GER)	0
Aljaž Venko (SLO)	2
Dmitri Tretyak (FIN)	1
Michael O'Reilly (IRL)	3
Emir Šabotić (MNE)	0

Quarterfinals; 24 June
Salvatore Cavallaro (ITA)	1
Maxim Koptyakov (RUS)	2
Aljaž Venko (SLO)	0
Michael O'Reilly (IRL)	3

Semifinals; 26 June
Maxim Koptyakov (RUS)
Michael O'Reilly (IRL)	WO

=== Bottom half ===
Round of 32; 18 June
Vitali Bandarenka (BLR)	3
Badri Khardziani (GEO)	0
Christian M'billi (FRA)	3
Victor Carapcevschii (MDA)	0
Tomas Pivarunas (LTU)	3
Đorđe Tomić (BIH)	0
Leon Chartoi (SWE)	0
Vladyslav Voitaliuk (UKR)	3

Round of 16; 21 June
Artem Masliy (ISR)	0
Vitali Bandarenka (BLR)	3
Christian M'billi (FRA)	0
Xaybula Musalov (AZE)	3
Kamil Gardzielik (POL)	3
Tomas Pivarunas (LTU)	0
Vladyslav Voitaliuk (UKR)	0
Zoltán Harcsa (HUN)	3

Quarterfinals; 24 June
Vitali Bandarenka (BLR)	0
Xaybula Musalov (AZE)	3
Kamil Gardzielik (POL)	0
Zoltán Harcsa (HUN)	3

Semifinals; 26 June
Xaybula Musalov (AZE)	2
Zoltán Harcsa (HUN)	1
