= 2008 European Amateur Boxing Championships =

Boxing competitions

- Host city: Liverpool
- Country: England
- Dates: 6-15 November

The Men's 2008 European Amateur Boxing Championships were held in Liverpool, England in November 2008. They were the 37th edition of this biennial competition organised by the European governing body for amateur boxing, EABA.

== Medal winners ==
Event	Gold	Silver	Bronze
Light Flyweight (– 48 kilograms)	Hovhannes Danielyan; Armenia	Jose de la Nieve Linares; Spain	Istvan Ungvari; Hungary Ferhat Pehlivan; Turkey
Flyweight (– 51 kilograms)	Georgiy Chygayev; Ukraine	Salomo N'tuve; Sweden	Alexandr Riscan; Moldova (North Macedonia) Munin Veli; Macedonia
Bantamweight (– 54 kilograms)	Luke Campbell; England	Detelin Dalakliev; Bulgaria	Denis Makarov; Germany Andrew Selby; Wales
Featherweight (– 57 kilograms)	Vasyl Lomachenko; Ukraine	Araik Ambartsumov; Russia	Hicham Ziouti; France Bashir Hassan; Sweden
Lightweight (– 60 kilograms)	Leonid Kostylev; Russia	Vazgen Safaryants; Belarus	(Republic of Ireland) Ross Hickey; Ireland Miklos Varga; Hungary
Light Welterweight (– 64 kilograms)	Eduard Hambardzumyan; Armenia	Gyula Kate; Hungary	(Republic of Ireland) John Joe Joyce; Ireland Marcin Legowski; Poland
Welterweight (– 69 kilograms)	Mahamed Nurudzinau; Belarus	Jack Culcay-Keth; Germany	Abdülkadir Köroğlu; Turkey Jaoid Chiguer; France
Middleweight (– 75 kilograms)	Ivan Senay; Ukraine	Maxim Koptyakov; Russia	(Republic of Ireland) Eamonn O'Kane; Ireland Victor Cotiujanshiu; Moldova
Light Heavyweight (– 81 kilograms)	Oleksandr Usyk; Ukraine	Siarhei Karneyeu; Belarus	Nikolajs Grishunins; Latvia Rene Krause; Germany
Heavyweight (– 91 kilograms)	Egor Mekhontsev; Russia	Tsolak Ananikyan; Armenia	Petrisor Gananau; Romania Jozsef Darmos; Hungary
Super Heavyweight (+ 91 kilograms)	Kubrat Pulev; Bulgaria	Denis Sergeev; Russia	Roman Kapitanenko; Ukraine Memnun Hadžić; Bosnia and Herzegovina

== Medal table ==
Rank	Nation	Gold	Silver	Bronze	Total
1	Ukraine (UKR)	4	0	1	5
2	Russia (RUS)	2	3	0	5
3	Armenia (ARM)	2	1	0	3
4	Belarus (BLR)	1	2	0	3
5	Bulgaria (BUL)	1	1	0	2
6	England (ENG)	1	0	0	1
7	Hungary (HUN)	0	1	3	4
8	Germany (GER)	0	1	2	3
9	Sweden (SWE)	0	1	1	2
10	Spain (ESP)	0	1	0	1
11	Ireland (IRL)	0	0	3	3
12	France (FRA)	0	0	2	2
12	Moldova (MDA)	0	0	2	2
12	Turkey (TUR)	0	0	2	2
15	Bosnia and Herzegovina (BIH)	0	0	1	1
15	Latvia (LAT)	0	0	1	1
15	North Macedonia (MKD)	0	0	1	1
15	Poland (POL)	0	0	1	1
15	Romania (ROU)	0	0	1	1
15	Wales (WAL)	0	0	1	1
Totals (20 entries)		11	11	22	44
