= Araik Tunyan =

Araik Tunyan Արայիկ Թունյան

The Members of the Constitutional Court of Armenia

Personal details
- Born: January 6, 1966 (age 60) Stepanavan, Soviet Union
- Education: Moscow State University

Araik Tunyan (born January 6, 1966, Stepanavan) is a docent and member of the Constitutional Court of Armenia.

== Early life and education ==
Tunyan was born January 6, 1966, in Stepanavan.

Tunyan served in the Soviet Army from 1984 to 1986, then graduated from the Department of Law of Moscow State University with honor in 1994. The following year, he took postgraduate study of Russian Academy of Sciences and obtained his PhD in legal studies.

== Work experience ==
- 1999–2001 worked as chief specialist department of legislative issues Ministry of Justice RA.
- since 2000 teaches at the Faculty of Law of the Russian-Armenian (Slavonic) State University.
- 2001–03 worked as the deputy head of on legislative issues Ministry of Justice RA.
- 2003–05 was head of the economic legislation of the Ministry of Justice RA.
- Since 2004 Head of the Department of Civil Law at the Law Faculty of the Russian-Armenian (Slavonic) University.
- 2005–07 was as a head of the state legal department of the RA President.
- 2007–14 was as a head of the Legal Department of the RA President.
- 2014 June 9 was appointed as a member of the Constitutional Court of Armenia, by the decision of the National Assembly of the RA.

== Other ==
- By the December 28, 2013 decree of the President of Armenia, awarded the medal "Mkhitar Gosh".
- By the December 29, 2011 decree of the President of Armenia, awarded to the class rank of the state adviser of the civil service of Armenia.
- PhD in law sciences, docent. Author of the scientific articles on the theory of law, civil law, civil procedure and land rights.
