= Ilunga Makabu =

Congolese boxer (born 1987)

Ilunga Makabu Jr.
Personal information
- Nickname: The Junior
- Born: Junior Ilunga Makabu; 8 November 1987 (age 38) Kananga, Zaire
- Height: 1.83 m (6 ft 0 in)
- Weight: Light-heavyweight; Cruiserweight

Boxing career
- Reach: 188 cm (74 in)
- Stance: Southpaw

Boxing record
- Total fights: 35
- Wins: 31
- Win by KO: 27
- Losses: 4

Junior Ilunga Makabu (born 8 November 1987) is a Congolese-South African professional boxer. He held the WBC cruiserweight title from 2020 to 2023.

As of June 2022, he is ranked as the world's second-best active cruiserweight by BoxRec, and Fourth by The Ring magazine, and the Transnational Boxing Rankings Board. He is the older brother of heavyweight boxer Martin Bakole.

== Professional career ==
=== Early career ===
His professional career began on 20 June 2008, losing a four-round bout by technical knockout in the first round against the South African boxer Khayeni Hlungwane. The fight was held at the Carousel Hotel & Casino in Temba in the province of North-West. On 13 September 2008, he achieved his first victory, defeating by technical knockout in the first round the representative of Zimbabwe Elvis Moyo. On 19 November 2011 he faced Brazilian Pedro Otas. A twelve-round fight was organized at Monte Casino in Johannesburg, starring Michael Buffer. The dominant Makabu ended the duel by technical knockout in the eleventh round.

=== WBC Silver cruiserweight champion ===
==== Makabu vs. Kudryashov ====
Makabu was scheduled to fight Dmitry Kudryashov for the vacant WBC Silver cruiserweight title on 16 June 2019, at the KRK Uralets in Yekaterinburg, Russia. The two fighters had a combined 46 knockouts in 47 total fights, which led many media outlets to predict that the fight would end in a finish. Makabu won the fight by a fifth-round technical knockout. Although Kudryashov wasn't knocked down, the stream of undefended punches near the end of the fifth round forced the referee to step in and stop the bout.

==== Makabu vs. Papin ====
On 12 July 2019, rumors surfaced that Makabu would defend his WBC Silver title against the undefeated Alexei Papin, who was the #14 ranked IBF cruiserweight contender. On 30 July, the WBC confirmed that the fight would take place on the Sergey Kovalev vs. Anthony Yarde undercard, on 24 August 2019, at the Traktor Sport Palace in Chelyabinsk, Russia. Makabu won the fight by majority decision, with two judges scoring the fight 115–113 in his favor, while the third judge scored it as a 113–113 draw. Papin flagged in the mid-rounds, and was nearly finished in the eight round and twelfth rounds.

=== WBC cruiserweight champion ===
==== Makabu vs. Cieślak ====
Makabu was scheduled to face the undefeated Michał Cieślak for the vacant WBC cruiserweight title on 31 January 2020, at the Temporary Arena in Kinshasa, Democratic Republic of the Congo. Cieślak was originally scheduled to fight Nuri Seferi on 20 December 2019, before he withdrew from that bout to face Makabu for the WBC title on 18 January 2020. Cieslak was ranked #2 by the WBC at cruiserweight. However, due to some disagreements between Makabu and the WBC, the fight was postponed to 31 January. Cieślak faced further problems on the day before the fight, as both he and his promoters were robbed at the hotel they were staying at in Kinshasa.

Cieślak had a great start to the fight and appeared close to finishing Makabu in the third round, only for the round to end a full minute early. Makabu rebounded in the fourth round, knocking Cieślak down with two heavy blows, one of which was a blatant uncalled rabbit punch. Cieślak returned the favor in the fifth round, as Makabu was ruled to be in a state of knockdown after he touched the canvas with his glove. Makabu was awarded the unanimous decision after twelve rounds, with scores of 114–112, 115–111 and 116–111.

==== Makabu vs. Durodola ====
Makabu made his first defense of his WBC cruiserweight title against the reigning African cruiserweight champion Olanrewaju Durodola at the Studio Mama Angebi in Kinshasa, Congo. Durodola was ranked #3 by the WBC at cruiserweight. He won the fight by a come-from-behind seventh-round knockout. Makabu appeared to be down on the scorecards after the first six rounds were fought, but rallied back to knock Durodola down with a pair of left hooks with a minute to go in the seventh round. Although Durodola managed to beat the eight-count, the referee nonetheless decided to wave off the fight.

==== Makabu vs. Mchunu ====
At the WBC Convention on 15 November 2021 in Mexico City, the organization approved the request of Canelo Álvarez's trainer and manager, Eddy Reynoso, to have Álvarez challenge Makabu for his WBC cruiserweight title. Álvarez has never competed at cruiserweight, so Reynoso needed to petition the WBC to order the title fight. The cruiserweight limit was 200 pounds, but it had recently been reduced to 190 pounds due to the introduction of bridgerweight. The fight was expected to take place in May 2022.

Makabu was instead booked to make the second defense of his WBC title against mandatory challenger Thabiso Mchunu on 29 January 2022, at the Packard Music Hall in Warren, Ohio. Mchunu was the number 1 ranked cruiserweight by the WBC and fourth best cruiserweight in the world according to The Ring magazine. The winner of the bout was granted permission to face Canelo Álvarez by the WBC, at the request of Alvarez's team. The fight headlined a Don King promoted card, which was independently broadcast on Fite TV. Makabu won the fight by split decision. Two of the judge scored the bout in his favor (115–113 and 116–112), while the third judge scored it 115–113 for Mchunu. The split decision was seen as controversial, as many news outlets scored the fight for Mchunu. However, Makabu was confident that he had done enough to secure the victory and called out the undisputed super middleweight champion Saul Alvarez in his post-fight interview, stating: "My next fight is with Saul Canelo - I'm going to box and knock you out".

==== Makabu vs. Jack ====
Makabu was expected to make his third title defense against the WBA (Regular) cruiserweight champion Ryad Merhy. The fight was scheduled as the main event of a card which took place 30 September 2022, at the Stade des Martyrs in Kinshasa, Congo. On 19 July 2022, Merhy was ordered by the WBA to face their "Super" cruiserweight champion Arsen Goulamirian, while Merhy stated his desire to move up to bridgerweight on 8 August, as he was finding it difficult to make the cruiserweight limit.

On 9 December, it was revealed that Makabu would make his third title defense against the WBC Silver champion Noel Mikaelian. The bout was expected to take place at the Casino Miami Jai-Alai in Miami, Florida, on 21 January 2023. The fight was postponed on 5 January 2023, for undisclosed reasons. Makabu was instead scheduled to defend his title against the two-weight world champion Badou Jack on 26 February 2023, on the Jake Paul vs Tommy Fury undercard. Makabu lost the fight by a twelfth-round technical knockout.

=== Later cruiserweight career ===
==== Makabu vs. Mikaelian ====
On 17 September 2023, it was revealed that the reigning WBC cruiserweight champion Badou Jack had vacated his title in order to contest the sanctioning body's bridgerweight championship. Don King Promotions announced, one week later, that Makabu would face the mandatory challenger Noel Mikaelian for the now vacant belt. The fight took place on 4 November 2023, at the Casino Miami Jai Alai in Miami, Florida. Makabu lost the fight by a third-round technical knockout.

== Professional boxing record ==
35 fights	31 wins	4 losses
By knockout	27	4
By decision	4	0

No.	Result	Record	Opponent	Type	Round, time	Date	Location	Notes
35	Win	31–4	Dodzi Kemeh	RTD	3 (10)	5 Sep 2025	Stadium Basket, Stade Des Martyrs, Kinshasa, Democratic Republic Of The Congo	
34	Win	30–4	Wagdy Attia	KO	3 (12), 1:00	21 Dec 2024	Gymnase Jumele Stade de Martyrs, Kinshasa, Congo	
33	Loss	29–4	Noel Mikaelian	TKO	3 (12), 1:00	4 Nov 2023	Casino Miami Jai Alai, Miami, Florida, U.S.	For vacant WBC cruiserweight title
32	Loss	29–3	Badou Jack	TKO	12 (12), 0:54	26 Feb 2023	Diriyah Arena, Diriyah, Saudi Arabia	Lost WBC cruiserweight title
31	Win	29–2	Thabiso Mchunu	SD	12	29 Jan 2022	Packard Music Hall, Warren, Ohio, U.S.	Retained WBC cruiserweight title
30	Win	28–2	Olanrewaju Durodola	TKO	7 (12), 0:55	19 Dec 2020	Studio Mama Angebi, Kinshasa, Congo	Retained WBC cruiserweight title
29	Win	27–2	Michał Cieślak	UD	12	31 Jan 2020	Temporary Arena, Kinshasa, Congo	Won vacant WBC cruiserweight title
28	Win	26–2	Alexei Papin	MD	12	24 Aug 2019	Traktor Sport Palace, Chelyabinsk, Russia	Retained WBC Silver cruiserweight title
27	Win	25–2	Dmitry Kudryashov	TKO	5 (12), 2:36	16 Jun 2019	KRK Uralets, Yekaterinburg, Russia	Won vacant WBC Silver cruiserweight title
26	Win	24–2	Giorgi Tevdorashvili	KO	2 (10), 1:55	8 Dec 2018	Euskirchen, North Rhine-Westphalia, Germany	
25	Win	23–2	Paata Aduashvili	KO	2 (8)	26 Oct 2018	Salle du Monte d’Or, Champagne-au-Mont-d'Or, France	
24	Win	22–2	Taylor Mabika	RTD	4 (12), 3:00	22 Sep 2018	Grand Hôtel de Kinshasa, Kinshasa, Congo	Won WBC International cruiserweight title
23	Win	21–2	Mussa Ajibu	KO	4 (8)	25 Aug 2017	Rainbow Towers Conference Centre, Harare, Zimbabwe	
22	Win	20–2	Chamunorwa Gonorenda	KO	5 (10)	28 Apr 2017	Carnival City, Brakpan, South Africa	
21	Loss	19–2	Tony Bellew	KO	3 (12), 1:20	29 May 2016	Goodison Park, Liverpool, England	For vacant WBC cruiserweight title
20	Win	19–1	Thabiso Mchunu	KO	11 (12), 1:56	26 May 2015	International Convention Centre, Durban, South Africa	
19	Win	18–1	Tamas Bajzath	TKO	3 (10), 2:15	05 Dec 2014	Centre Sportif Obercorn, Differdange, Luxembourg	
18	Win	17–1	Glen Johnson	TKO	9 (12), 2:40	28 Jun 2014	Grand Hôtel de Kinshasa, Kinshasa, Congo	Won WBC International cruiserweight title
17	Win	16–1	Ruben Angel Mino	KO	2 (10), 1:53	01 Feb 2014	Salle des Étoiles, Monte Carlo, Monaco	
16	Win	15–1	Eric Fields	KO	5 (12), 1:59	31 Aug 2013	Emperors Palace, Kempton Park, South Africa	Retained WBC Silver cruiserweight title
15	Win	14–1	Dmytro Kucher	MD	12	13 Jul 2013	Salle des Étoiles, Monte Carlo, Monaco	Won vacant WBC Silver cruiserweight title
14	Win	13–1	Tamas Lodi	TKO	3 (10), 1:29	30 Mar 2013	Salle des Étoiles, Monte Carlo, Monaco	
13	Win	12–1	Gogita Gorgiladze	TKO	4 (10), 1:49	16 Feb 2013	Emperors Palace, Kempton Park, South Africa	Won vacant IBF Youth cruiserweight title
12	Win	11–1	Michael Gbenga	TKO	5 (8), 2:53	24 Apr 2012	Carnival City Casino, Brakpan, South Africa	
11	Win	10–1	Pedro Otas	TKO	11 (12), 2:54	19 Nov 2011	Monte Casino, Johannesburg, South Africa	Won vacant WBF cruiserweight title
10	Win	9–1	Collice Mutizwa	KO	1 (6)	11 Jun 2011	Carnival City, Brakpan, South Africa	
9	Win	8–1	Nsitu Mbaya	KO	1 (6)	26 Mar 2011	Nasrec Indoor Arena, Johannesburg, South Africa	
8	Win	7–1	Danie Venter	TKO	6 (6)	30 Oct 2010	Klipriviersberg Recreation Centre, Johannesburg, South Africa	
7	Win	6–1	Elvis Moyo	TKO	2 (6)	27 Mar 2010	Carousel Casino, Hammanskraal, South Africa	
6	Win	5–1	Ben Moakamela	TKO	2 (6)	07 Mar 2010	Nasrec Indoor Arena, Johannesburg, South Africa	
5	Win	4–1	Chamunorwa Gonorenda	TKO	2 (6)	26 Feb 2010	Nasrec Indoor Arena, Johannesburg, South Africa	
4	Win	3–1	Sean Santana	TKO	3 (6)	03 Jul 2009	Nirvana Secondary School, Lenasia, South Africa	
3	Win	2–1	Nicholas Ramantswana	TKO	1 (4)	18 Oct 2008	Park Station Concourse, Johannesburg, South Africa	
2	Win	1–1	Elvis Moyo	TKO	1 (4)	13 Sep 2008	Emperors Palace, Kempton Park, South Africa	
1	Loss	0–1	Khayeni Hlungwane	TKO	1 (4), 0:29	20 Jun 2008	Carousel Casino, Hammanskraal, South Africa	

== See also ==
- List of world cruiserweight boxing champions

Sporting positions
Minor World boxing titles
Vacant Title last held by Paweł Kołodziej	WBF cruiserweight champion 19 November 2011 – 2011; Vacated	Vacant Title next held by Danie Venter
Major World boxing titles
Vacant Title last held by Oleksandr Usyk	WBC cruiserweight champion 31 January 2020 – 26 February 2023	Succeeded by Badou Jack
