= Leonid Kostylev =

Russian boxer

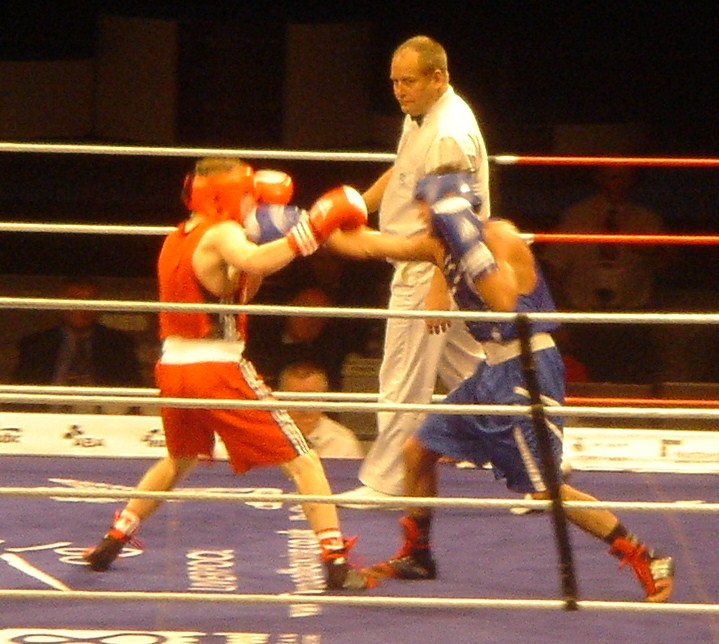
- Leonid Kostylev (Red) and Vazgen Safaryants (Blue)
Medal record
Representing Russia
Men's boxing
European Amateur Championships
Gold medal – first place	2008 Liverpool	Lightweight

Leonid Kostylev is a Russian amateur boxer who won the gold medal at the 2008 European Amateur Boxing Championships in the lightweight division.

== Russian national championships ==
Kostylev won a gold medal in the 2008 Lightweight Russian senior national championships beating Eduard Khusainov in the final by 14:3.

== European Amateur Championships ==
Following his victory in the national championships Kostylev then represented Russia at the 2008 European Amateur Boxing Championships in Liverpool, England. He won a gold medal after defeating Belarus' Vazgen Safaryants 7:3 in the final.

=== European Championships results ===
2008 (as a Featherweight)

- Preliminary round - BYE
- Second round Defeated Steven Sharoudi (Scotland) 9:5
- Quarter Finals Defeated Rachid Azzedine (France) 9:3
- Semi Finals Defeated Miklós Varga (Hungary) 11:2
- Finals Defeated Vazgen Safaryants (Belarus) 7:3
