= Aleksei Kostylev =

Soviet footballer (1914–1989)

Personal information
- Full name: Aleksei Nikolayevich Kostylev
- Date of birth: 1914
- Place of birth: Moscow, Russia
- Date of death: 1989 (aged 74–75)
- Place of death: Moscow, Russian SFSR
- Position: Midfielder

Senior career*
Years	Team	Apps	(Gls)
1929–1932	FC Start Moscow		
1932–1934	FC Promkooperatsiya-II Moscow		
1936–1937	FC Dynamo Kalinin		
1938–1939	FC Dynamo Kazan		
1940–1941	FC Spartak Kishinyov		

Managerial career
- 1939: FC Dynamo Kazan
- 1947–1948: FC Shakhtyor Stalino
- 1949–1950: FC Torpedo Stalingrad
- 1951: FC Spartak Uzhgorod
- 1953–1954: FC Metallurg Odessa
- 1955–1956: FC Metallurg Zaporozhye
- 1957–1959: FC Trud Voronezh
- 1962: FC Lokomotiv Moscow
- 1963: FC Trud Voronezh
- 1964–1965: FC Kuban Krasnodar
- 1969: FC Torpedo Taganrog
- 1971: FC Sakhalin Yuzhno-Sakhalinsk
- * Club domestic league appearances and goals

Aleksei Nikolayevich Kostylev (Russian: Алексе́й Никола́евич Ко́стылев; 1914 in Moscow – 1989 in Moscow) was a Soviet Russian football player and coach.

== Career ==
During World War II Kostylev played for the Soviet FC Spartak Kishenev at the newly Soviet occupied territories of Bessarabia (Moldavian SSR). After the Nazi invasion of the Soviet Union he became a POW at Mauthausen-Gusen concentration camp.

After the war, he continued to coach at Southern Russia and Ukraine.
