= Araik Ambartsumov =

Russian boxers

Medal record

Representing Russia

Men's boxing

European Amateur Championships
Silver medal – second place	2008 Liverpool	featherweight

Araik Ambartsumov is a Russian amateur boxer of Armenian descent who won the silver medal at the 2008 European Amateur Boxing Championships in the featherweight division.

== Russian national championships ==
Ambartsumov won a gold medal in the 2008 featherweight Russian senior national championships beating Ruslan Kamilov in the final by 6:4.

== European Amateur Championships ==
Following his victory in the national championships Ambartsumov then represented Russia at the 2008 European Amateur Boxing Championships in Liverpool, England. He won a silver medal after losing to Ukraine's Vasyl Lomachenko 7:1 in the final.

=== European Championships results ===
2008 (as a Featherweight)

- Preliminary round - BYE
- Second round Defeated Alessio di Savino (Italy) 4:1
- Quarter Finals Defeated Mirsa Ahmeti (Albania) 13:0
- Semi Finals Defeated Bashir Hassan (Sweden) 9:2
- Finals Lost to Vasyl Lomachenko (Ukraine) 7:1
