= Laos at the 2022 Asian Games =

- IOC code: LAO
- NOC: National Olympic Committee of Laos

in Hangzhou, China 23 September 2023 – 8 October 2023
- Medals Ranked 34th: Gold 0 Silver 0 Bronze 3 Total 3

Asian Games appearances (overview)
- 1974; 1978; 1982; 1986; 1990; 1994; 1998; 2002; 2006; 2010; 2014; 2018; 2022; 2026

Laos competed at the 2022 Asian Games in Hangzhou, Zhejiang, China, which began on 23 September 2023 and ended on 8 October 2023. The event was scheduled to be held in September 2022 but was postponed due to the rising COVID-19 cases in China. The event was later rescheduled to be held in September–October 2023. In total, 94 athletes from Laos competed in 17 different disciplines in this 19th Asian Games.

== Medalists ==
=== Medals by sport ===
Medals by sport
Sport	Gold	Silver	Bronze	Total
Sepak takraw	0	0	3	3
Total	0	0	3	3

== Wushu ==
Sanda

Athlete	Event	Round of 16	Quarter-finals	Semi-finals	Final	
Athlete	Event	Opposition Score	Opposition Score	Opposition Score	Opposition Score	Rank
Hak Phommachanh	Men's –56 kg	Hứa (VIE); L PD	Did not advance			
Donechanh Phetmala	Men's –65 kg	Koldosh Uulu (KGZ); L PD	Did not advance			
Phonh Saibounpheng	Men's –70 kg	Rai (NEP); W 2–0	Zhang (TPE); L 0–2	Did not advance		

== Boxing ==
P	Round of 32	R	Round of 16	¼	Quarterfinals	½	Semifinals	F	Final

Event↓/Date →	24th Sun	25th Mon	26th Tue	27th Wed	28th Thu	29th Fri	30th Sat	1st Sun	2nd Mon	3rd Tue	4th Wed	5th Thu
Men's 51 kg		P			R					¼	½	F
Men's 57 kg			P				R			¼	½	F
Men's 63.5 kg	P			R				¼		½	F	
Men's 71 kg		P			R		¼			½	F	
Men's 80 kg	P					R		¼			½	F
Men's 92 kg				R		¼		½		F		
Men's +92 kg			R				¼			½		F
Women's 50 kg	P			R		¼		½		F		
Women's 54 kg	R						¼			½	F	
Women's 57 kg						R		¼			½	F
Women's 60 kg	P				R			¼		½	F	
Women's 66 kg		R						¼			½	F
Women's 75 kg			R				¼			½	F	

=== Men's 51 kg ===
==== Legend ====
- KO — Won by knockout
- RSC — Won by referee stop contest
- RSCI — Won by referee stop contest injury

==== Final ====
Final
Thitisan Panmod (THA)	0
Hasanboy Dusmatov (UZB)	5

==== Top half ====
Preliminaries – R32
Daýanç Annaseýidow (TKM)	1
Abdulaziz Al-Atbi (KSA)	4
So Chon-ryong (PRK)	4
Azat Makhmetov (BRN)	0
Dio Koebanu (INA)	1
Rabin Thapa (NEP)	4
Mansour Khalefah (KUW)
Tu Po-wei (TPE)	RSC
Aaron Bado (PHI)
Thitisan Panmod (THA)	RSCI
Mehron Shafiev (TJK)
Zhang Jiamao (CHN)	RSC

Preliminaries – R16
Md Abu Talha (BAN)	1
Abdulaziz Al-Atbi (KSA)	4
So Chon-ryong (PRK)	5
Rabin Thapa (NEP)	0
Tu Po-wei (TPE)	1
Thitisan Panmod (THA)	4
Zhang Jiamao (CHN)	5
Nguyễn Minh Cường (VIE)	0

Quarterfinals
Abdulaziz Al-Atbi (KSA)
So Chon-ryong (PRK)	KO
Thitisan Panmod (THA)	5
Zhang Jiamao (CHN)	0

Semifinals
So Chon-ryong (PRK)	2
Thitisan Panmod (THA)	3

==== Bottom half ====
Preliminaries – R32
Deepak Bhoria (IND)	5
Abdul Qaiyum Ariffin (MAS)	0
Huthaifa Eshish (JOR)	0
Nurzhigit Diushebaev (KGZ)	5
Tenzin Drugyel (BHU)	2
Abdul Jabar Popalzai (AFG)	3
Saken Bibossinov (KAZ)	5
Orkhontungalagiin Önöbold (MGL)	0
Jo Se-hyeong (KOR)
Hasanboy Dusmatov (UZB)	RSCI
Vanesy Heuangthisouan (LAO)
Sultan Al-Nuaimi (UAE)	KO

Preliminaries – R16
Tomoya Tsuboi (JPN)	4
Deepak Bhoria (IND)	1
Nurzhigit Diushebaev (KGZ)	5
Abdul Jabar Popalzai (AFG)	0
Saken Bibossinov (KAZ)	1
Hasanboy Dusmatov (UZB)	4
Sultan Al-Nuaimi (UAE)	0
Zohaib Rasheed (PAK)	5

Quarterfinals
Tomoya Tsuboi (JPN)	5
Nurzhigit Diushebaev (KGZ)	0
Hasanboy Dusmatov (UZB)	5
Zohaib Rasheed (PAK)	0

Semifinals
Tomoya Tsuboi (JPN)	1
Hasanboy Dusmatov (UZB)	4

=== Men's 57 kg ===
==== Legend ====
- KO — Won by knockout
- RSC — Won by referee stop contest
- RSCI — Won by referee stop contest injury
- WO — Won by walkover

==== Final ====
Final
Abdumalik Khalokov (UZB)	KO
Shudai Harada (JPN)

==== Top half ====
Preliminaries – R32
Carlo Paalam (PHI)	5
Mohammad Abu Jajeh (JOR)	0
Buddha Gyamjo Lama (NEP)	0
Nguyễn Văn Đương (VIE)	4
Lee Cheng-wei (TPE)	0
Abdumalik Khalokov (UZB)	5
Asri Udin (INA)	0
Sachin Siwach (IND)	5
Mohammad Edriss Jafari (AFG)	2
Turki Abuquthailah (KUW)	3
Lü Ping (CHN)	5
Danial Shahbakhsh (IRI)	0
Muhammad Qasim (PAK)	5
Nawwaf Al-Zahmi (UAE)	0

Preliminaries – R16
Munarbek Seitbek Uulu (KGZ)	1
Carlo Paalam (PHI)	4
Nguyễn Văn Đương (VIE)	0
Abdumalik Khalokov (UZB)	5
Sachin Siwach (IND)	WO
Turki Abuquthailah (KUW)
Lü Ping (CHN)	5
Muhammad Qasim (PAK)	0

Quarterfinals
Carlo Paalam (PHI)	0
Abdumalik Khalokov (UZB)	5
Sachin Siwach (IND)	1
Lü Ping (CHN)	4

Semifinals
Abdumalik Khalokov (UZB)	5
Lü Ping (CHN)	0

==== Bottom half ====
Preliminaries – R32
Mohammed Al-Qarnas (YEM)	0
Gantömöriin Lundaa (MGL)	5
Shudai Harada (JPN)	5
Ziyad Majrashi (KSA)	0
Salim Hossain (BAN)	3
Rukmal Prasanna (SRI)	2
Souliya Khammy (LAO)
Asror Vokhidov (TJK)	RSC
Tashi Yoezer (BHU)	0
Wasim Abusal (PLE)	5
Rujakran Juntrong (THA)	5
Rex Tso (HKG)	0
Lee Ye-chan (KOR)	0
Makhmud Sabyrkhan (KAZ)	5

Preliminaries – R16
Gantömöriin Lundaa (MGL)	1
Shudai Harada (JPN)	4
Salim Hossain (BAN)	RSCI
Asror Vokhidov (TJK)
Wasim Abusal (PLE)	0
Rujakran Juntrong (THA)	5
Makhmud Sabyrkhan (KAZ)	2
O Tae-bom (PRK)	3

Quarterfinals
Shudai Harada (JPN)	5
Salim Hossain (BAN)	0
Rujakran Juntrong (THA)	5
O Tae-bom (PRK)	0

Semifinals
Shudai Harada (JPN)	3
Rujakran Juntrong (THA)	2

=== Men's 63.5 Kg ===
==== Legend ====
- KO — Won by knockout
- RSC — Won by referee stop contest

==== Final ====
Final
Lai Chu-en (TPE)	0
Baatarsükhiin Chinzorig (MGL)	5

==== Top half ====
Preliminaries – R32
Walter Sarnoi Oupathana (LAO)
Lai Chu-en (TPE)	RSC
Dorji Wangdi (BHU)
Mark Ashley Fajardo (PHI)	KO
Lee Jong-seung (KOR)	0
Ali Qasim (IRQ)	5
Mousa Al-Hawsawi (KSA)
Askat Kultaev (KGZ)	KO

Preliminaries – R16
Bhupendra Thapa (NEP)	0
Lai Chu-en (TPE)	4
Mark Ashley Fajardo (PHI)	0
Wang Xiangyang (CHN)	5
Muhammad Ibrahim (PAK)	0
Ali Qasim (IRQ)	5
Askat Kultaev (KGZ)	5
Shiva Thapa (IND)	0

Quarterfinals
Lai Chu-en (TPE)	3
Wang Xiangyang (CHN)	2
Ali Qasim (IRQ)	3
Askat Kultaev (KGZ)	2

Semifinals
Lai Chu-en (TPE)	5
Ali Qasim (IRQ)	0

==== Bottom half ====
Preliminaries – R32
Yuta Akiyama (JPN)	1
Choe Chol-man (PRK)	4
Bunjong Sinsiri (THA)	5
Ali Habibinejad (IRI)	0
Obada Al-Kasbeh (JOR)	0
Yertugan Zeinullinov (KAZ)	5
Baatarsükhiin Chinzorig (MGL)	4
Hursand Imankuliýew (TKM)	1

Preliminaries – R16
Naseem Al-Qadhi (YEM)	0
Choe Chol-man (PRK)	5
Bunjong Sinsiri (THA)	RSC
Mohammed Soud (PLE)
Bakhodur Usmonov (TJK)	2
Yertugan Zeinullinov (KAZ)	3
Baatarsükhiin Chinzorig (MGL)	5
Ruslan Abdullaev (UZB)	0

Quarterfinals
Choe Chol-man (PRK)	2
Bunjong Sinsiri (THA)	3
Yertugan Zeinullinov (KAZ)	0
Baatarsükhiin Chinzorig (MGL)	5

Semifinals
Bunjong Sinsiri (THA)	0
Baatarsükhiin Chinzorig (MGL)	5
