= 2015 AIBA World Boxing Championships – Light flyweight =

Boxing competitions

The light flyweight bouts in the 2015 AIBA World Boxing Championships were held from 5–18 October 2015, and served as qualifying tournaments for the 2016 Summer Olympics. Joahnys Argilagos of Cuba defeated Vasily Yegorov of Russia to win the world title.

== Medalists ==
| Gold | Joahnys Argilagos (CUB) |
| Silver | Vasily Yegorov (RUS) |
| Bronze | Rogen Ladon (PHI) |
| Bronze | Dmytro Zamotaev (UKR) |

== Seeds ==
1. (Mexico) Joselito Velázquez (round of 16)
2. (Uzbekistan) Hasanboy Dusmatov (round of 16)
3. (Cuba) Joahnys Argilagos
4. (Russia) Vasilii Egorov

== Draw ==
=== Finals ===
Semifinals
1 | Rogen Ladon (PHI) | 0
4 | Vasily Yegorov (RUS) | 3
3 | Joahnys Argilagos (CUB) | 3
2 | Dmytro Zamotaev (UKR) | 0

Final
Vasily Yegorov (RUS) | 0
Joahnys Argilagos (CUB) | 3

==== Section 1 ====
Round of 32
Leandro Blanc (ARG) | 0
Rogen Ladon (PHI) | 3
Cornelis Kwangu (INA) | 0
Tomoya Tsuboi (JPN) | 3
Harvey Horn (GBR) | 2
Devendro Singh (IND) | 1

Round of 16
Joselito Velázquez (MEX) | 0
Rogen Ladon (PHI) | 3
Dawid Jagodzinski (POL) | 3
Tinko Banabakov (BUL) | 0
Gan-Erdene Gankhuyag (MGL) | 3
Tomoya Tsuboi (JPN) | 0
Harvey Horn (GBR) | 0
Vasily Yegorov (RUS) | 3

Quarterfinals
Rogen Ladon (PHI) | 3
Dawid Jagodzinski (POL) | 0
Gan-Erdene Gankhuyag (MGL) | 1
Vasily Yegorov (RUS) | 2

Semifinals
Rogen Ladon (PHI) | 0
Vasily Yegorov (RUS) | 3

==== Section 2 ====
Round of 32
Samuel Carmona Heredia (ESP) | 3
Murodjon Rasulov (TJK) | 0
Brendan Irvine (IRL) | 3
Nico Hernandez (USA) | 0
Imad Ahyoun (MAR) | 0
Rufat Huseynov (AZE) | 3

Round of 16
Joahnys Argilagos (CUB) | 3
Samuel Carmona Heredia (ESP) | 0
Brendan Irvine (IRL) | 2
Muhammed Ünlü (TUR) | 1
Dmytro Zamotaev (UKR) | 3
Josh English (AUS) | 0
Rufat Huseynov (AZE) | 2
Hasanboy Dusmatov (UZB) | 1

Quarterfinals
Joahnys Argilagos (CUB) | 3
Brendan Irvine (IRL) | 0
Dmytro Zamotaev (UKR) | 2
Rufat Huseynov (AZE) | 1

Semifinals
Joahnys Argilagos (CUB) | 3
Dmytro Zamotaev (UKR) | 0

== Results ==
=== Ranking ===
| Rank | Athlete |
|---|---|
| 1st place, gold medalist(s) | Joahnys Argilagos (CUB) |
| 2nd place, silver medalist(s) | Vasily Yegorov (RUS) |
| 3rd place, bronze medalist(s) | Rogen Ladon (PHI) |
| 3rd place, bronze medalist(s) | Dmytro Zamotaev (UKR) |
| 5 | Dawid Jagodzinski (POL) |
| 5 | Gan-Erdene Gankhuyag (MGL) |
| 5 | Brendan Irvine (IRL) |
| 5 | Rufat Huseynov (AZE) |
| 9 | Tinko Banabakov (BUL) |
| 9 | Harvey Horn (GBR) |
| 9 | Tomoya Tsuboi (JPN) |
| 9 | Joselito Velázquez (MEX) |
| 9 | Imad Ahyoun (MAR) |
| 9 | Samuel Carmona Heredia (ESP) |
| 9 | Muhammed Ünlü (TUR) |
| 9 | Hasanboy Dusmatov (UZB) |
| 17 | Leandro Blanc (ARG) |
| 17 | Devendro Singh (IND) |
| 17 | Cornelis Kwangu (INA) |
| 17 | Imad Ahyoun (MAR) |
| 17 | Murodjon Rasulov (TJK) |
| 17 | Nico Hernandez (USA) |
