= Boxing at the 2022 Asian Games – Men's 63.5 kg =

Boxing competitions

Men's 63.5 kg at the 2022 Asian Games
- Venue: Hangzhou Gymnasium
- Date: 24 September – 4 October 2023
- Competitors: 24 from 24 nations

Medalists
silver medal	Lai Chu-en	Chinese Taipei
bronze medal	Ali Qasim	Iraq
bronze medal	Bunjong Sinsiri	Thailand

The men's 63.5 kilograms event at the 2022 Asian Games took place from 24 September to 4 October 2023 at Hangzhou Gymnasium, Hangzhou, China.

== Schedule ==
All times are China Standard Time (UTC+08:00)

Date	Time	Event
Sunday, 24 September 2023	14:00	Preliminaries – R32
Wednesday, 27 September 2023	14:00	Preliminaries – R16
Sunday, 1 October 2023	14:00	Quarterfinals
Tuesday, 3 October 2023	19:00	Semifinals
Wednesday, 4 October 2023	19:00	Final

== Results ==
Legend

- KO — Won by knockout
- RSC — Won by referee stop contest

=== Final ===
Final
Lai Chu-en (TPE)	0
Baatarsükhiin Chinzorig (MGL)	5

=== Top half ===
Preliminaries – R32
Walter Sarnoi Oupathana (LAO)
Lai Chu-en (TPE)	RSC
Dorji Wangdi (BHU)
Mark Ashley Fajardo (PHI)	KO
Lee Jong-seung (KOR)	0
Ali Qasim (IRQ)	5
Mousa Al-Hawsawi (KSA)
Askat Kultaev (KGZ)	KO

Preliminaries – R16
Bhupendra Thapa (NEP)	0
Lai Chu-en (TPE)	4
Mark Ashley Fajardo (PHI)	0
Wang Xiangyang (CHN)	5
Muhammad Ibrahim (PAK)	0
Ali Qasim (IRQ)	5
Askat Kultaev (KGZ)	5
Shiva Thapa (IND)	0

Quarterfinals
Lai Chu-en (TPE)	3
Wang Xiangyang (CHN)	2
Ali Qasim (IRQ)	3
Askat Kultaev (KGZ)	2

Semifinals
Lai Chu-en (TPE)	5
Ali Qasim (IRQ)	0

=== Bottom half ===
Preliminaries – R32
Yuta Akiyama (JPN)	1
Choe Chol-man (PRK)	4
Bunjong Sinsiri (THA)	5
Ali Habibinejad (IRI)	0
Obada Al-Kasbeh (JOR)	0
Yertugan Zeinullinov (KAZ)	5
Baatarsükhiin Chinzorig (MGL)	4
Hursand Imankuliýew (TKM)	1

Preliminaries – R16
Naseem Al-Qadhi (YEM)	0
Choe Chol-man (PRK)	5
Bunjong Sinsiri (THA)	RSC
Mohammed Soud (PLE)
Bakhodur Usmonov (TJK)	2
Yertugan Zeinullinov (KAZ)	3
Baatarsükhiin Chinzorig (MGL)	5
Ruslan Abdullaev (UZB)	0

Quarterfinals
Choe Chol-man (PRK)	2
Bunjong Sinsiri (THA)	3
Yertugan Zeinullinov (KAZ)	0
Baatarsükhiin Chinzorig (MGL)	5

Semifinals
Bunjong Sinsiri (THA)	0
Baatarsükhiin Chinzorig (MGL)	5

- Baatarsükhiin Chinzorig of Mongolia originally won the gold medal, but was disqualified after he tested positive for Metandienone.
