= Joahnys Argilagos =

Cuban boxer (born 1997)

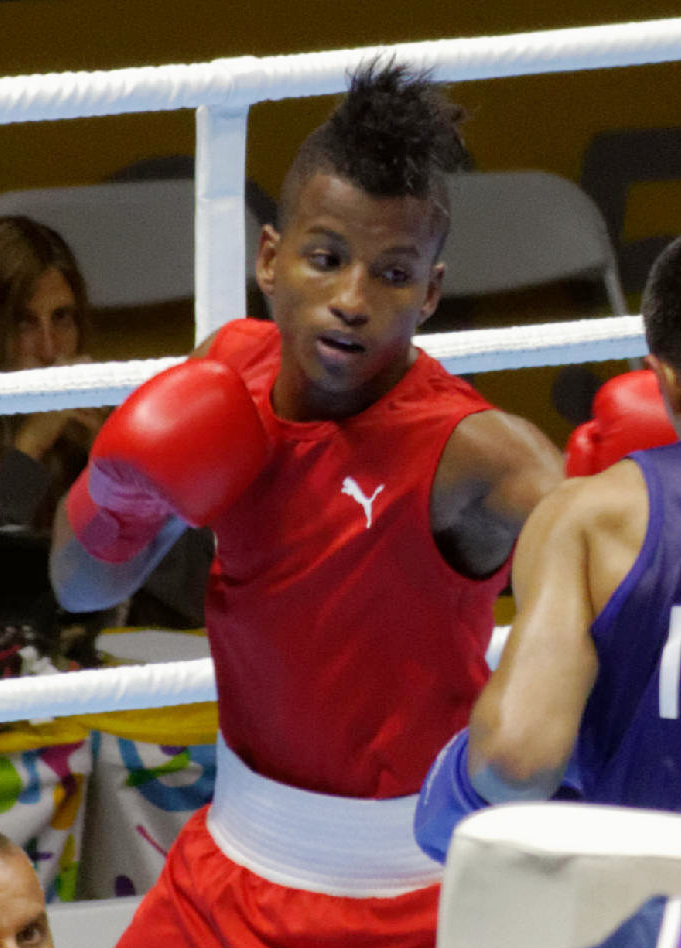
- Argilagos in 2015

Personal information
- Born: Joahnys Óscar Argilagos Pérez; 11 January 1997 (age 29) Camagüey, Cuba
- Height: 1.65 m (5 ft 5 in)
- Weight: Super flyweight

Boxing career
- Reach: 65 in (165 cm)

Boxing record
- Total fights: 11
- Wins: 9
- Win by KO: 4
- Losses: 2
Medal record
Men's amateur boxing
Representing Cuba
Olympic Games
Bronze medal – third place	2016 Rio Janeiro	Light flyweight
World Championships
Gold medal – first place	2015 Doha	Light flyweight
Gold medal – first place	2017 Hamburg	Light flyweight
Pan American Games
Silver medal – second place	2015 Toronto	Light flyweight
Pan American Championship
Silver medal – second place	2017 Tegucigalpa	Light flyweight

Joahnys Óscar Argilagos Pérez (Note: In this Spanish name, the first or paternal surname is Argilagos and the second or maternal family name is Pérez.) (born 11 January 1997) is a Cuban professional boxer. As an amateur, he won a bronze medal at the 2016 Summer Olympics as well as a gold medal at both the 2015 and 2017 World Championships.

Argilagos took up boxing in 2007 at the age of 10. He is fighting at amateur level for the World Series of Boxing, under the auspices of the (amateur) International Boxing Association. He has won the 2013 AIBA Junior World Championships, the 2015 AMBC American Confederation Boxing Championships, and the 2015 AIBA World Boxing Championships in light flyweight. He also won a silver medal at the 2015 Pan American Games and a bronze at the 2016 Olympics.

== Amateur career ==
=== Olympic result ===
Rio 2016

- Round of 16: Defeated Galal Yafai (Great Britain) 2–1
- Quarter-finals: Defeated Peter Mungai Warui (Kenya) 3–0
- Semi-finals: Defeated by Yuberjen Martínez (Colombia) 2–1

=== World Championship results ===
Doha 2015

- Round of 16: Defeated Samuel Carmona (Spain) 3–0
- Quarter-finals: Defeated Brendan Irvine (Republic of Ireland) 3–0
- Semi-finals: Defeated Dmytro Zamotayev (Ukraine) 3–0
- Final: Defeated Vasilii Egorov (Russia) 3–0

Hamburg 2017

- Second round: Defeated Oscar Collazo (Puerto Rico) 3–2
- Quarter-finals: Defeated Salah Ibrahim (Germany) 5–0
- Semi-finals: Defeated Zhomart Yerzhan (Kazakhstan) 5–0
- Final: Defeated Hasanboy Dusmatov (Uzbekistan) 3–2

=== Pan American Games result ===
Toronto 2015

- Quarter-finals: Defeated Kevin Arias (Nicaragua) 2–0
- Semi-finals: Defeated Yoel Finol (Venezuela) 2–1
- Final: Defeated by Joselito Velázquez (Mexico) 3–0

== Defection ==
In March 2018, Argilagos failed to appear at a weigh-in during a tournament in Tijuana. It was thought that Argilagos had defected from Cuba to become professional, following the likes of Luis Ortiz, Guillermo Rigondeaux and Yuriorkis Gamboa who had all previously defected from Cuba and later became professional.

== Professional boxing record ==
11 fights	9 wins	2 losses
By knockout	4	1
By decision	5	1

No.	Result	Record	Opponent	Type	Round, time	Date	Location	Notes
11	Loss	9–2	(Puerto Rico) Olajuwon Acosta	UD	10	10 May 2025	Palacio de Recreación y Deportes, Mayagüez, Puerto Rico	For the WBA Super Flyweight Continental Americas Championship.
10	Win	9–1	(United States) Mario Hernandez	UD	4	17 Dec 2022	(United States) The Cosmopolitan of Las Vegas, Las Vegas, Nevada, U.S	
9	Loss	8–1	(Venezuela) Michell Banquez	RTD	6 (10), 3:00	28 Jan 2022	(United States) Hialeah Park Race Track, Hialeah, Florida, US	
8	Win	8–0	(Mexico) Luis Javier Valdes	KO	1 (6), 0:29	7 Aug 2021	(United States) Minneapolis Armory, Minneapolis, Minnesota, US	
7	Win	7–0	(Chile) Juan Pablo Meza	UD	8	9 Jul 2021	(United States) Airport Hilton, Miami, Florida, US	
6	Win	6–0	(United States) Ernie Marquez	UD	4	29 Jan 2021	(United States) Seminole Hard Rock Hotel & Casino, Hollywood, Florida, US	
5	Win	5–0	(Mexico) Samuel Gutierrez	TKO	1 (6), 2:19	17 Oct 2020	(United States) Manual Artime Community Center Theater, Miami, Florida, US	
4	Win	4–0	(Mexico) Erick Alonso Hernandez	TKO	1 (4), 2:58	28 Feb 2020	(United States) Southern Junction Nightclub, Irving, Texas, US	
3	Win	3–0	(United States) Julio Garcia	TKO	2 (4), 1:19	31 Aug 2019	(United States) Minneapolis Armory, Minneapolis, Minnesota, US	
2	Win	2–0	(Nicaragua) Juan Centeno	SD	6	24 May 2019	(United States) Miccosukee Indian Gaming Resort, Miami, Florida, US	
1	Win	1–0	(United States) Josue Morales	MD	6	3 May 2019	(United States) Fort Bend Fairgrounds, Richmond, Texas, US	
