= Ireland at the 2015 European Games =

- IOC code: IRL
- NOC: Olympic Federation of Ireland
- Website: olympics.ie

in Baku, Azerbaijan 12 – 28 June 2015
- Competitors: 62 in 15 sports
- Flag bearer: Katie Taylor
- Medals Ranked 25th: Gold 2 Silver 1 Bronze 3 Total 6

European Games appearances (overview)
- 2015; 2019; 2023; 2027

Ireland competed at the 2015 European Games, in Baku, Azerbaijan from 12 to 28 June 2015.

Boxer Brendan Irvine guaranteed Ireland its first ever European Games medal on 22 June by winning his quarterfinal in the men's 49 kg boxing event, thus ensuring at worst a bronze medal.

== Medal summary ==
Medal	Name	Sport	Event	Date
Gold	Michael O'Reilly	Boxing	Men's 75 kg	27 June
Gold	Katie Taylor	Boxing	Women's 60 kg	27 June
Silver	Brendan Irvine	Boxing	Men's 49 kg	25 June
Bronze	Seán McComb	Boxing	Men's 60 kg	26 June
Bronze	Joshua Magee; Sam Magee	Badminton	Men's doubles	26 June
Bronze	Chloe Magee; Sam Magee	Badminton	Mixed doubles	27 June

Medals by sport
Sports	1st place, gold medalist(s)	2nd place, silver medalist(s)	3rd place, bronze medalist(s)	Total
Boxing	2	1	1	4
Badminton	0	0	2	2

== Archery ==
Ireland qualified two archers for the 2015 Games; as a result, Ireland was also eligible to field a team in the mixed pairs competition.

Athlete	Event	Ranking round		Round of 64	Round of 32	Round of 16	Quarterfinals	Semifinals	Final / BM	
Athlete	Event	Score	Seed	Opposition Score	Opposition Score	Opposition Score	Opposition Score	Opposition Score	Opposition Score	Rank
Darren Wallace	Men's individual	630	52	Pasqualucci (Italy); L 2–6	Did not advance					52
Sinead Cuthbert Cunningham	Women's individual	596	57	Erdyniyeva (Russia); L 0–6	Did not advance					57
Darren Wallace; Sinead Cuthbert Cunningham	Mixed Team	1226	27	—N/a		Did not advance				27

== Badminton ==
Ireland qualified an entrant in each of the five events, including the top seeds in men's singles and mixed doubles, and the sixth seed in women's singles.

Athlete	Event	Group Stages				Round of 16 Opposition Result	Quarterfinals Opposition Result	Semifinals Opposition Result	Final Opposition Result	Rank
Athlete	Event	Match 1 Opposition Result	Match 2 Opposition Result	Match 3 Opposition Result	Pool Rank	Round of 16 Opposition Result	Quarterfinals Opposition Result	Semifinals Opposition Result	Final Opposition Result	Rank
Scott Evans	Men's singles	Charalambidis (Greece); W 2–0; 21–7, 21–9	Krausz (Hungary); W 2–0; 21–16, 21–7	Tan (Belgium); W 2–1; 14–21, 21–13, 21–13	1 Q	Kisyov (Bulgaria); W 2–0; 21–6, 21–13	Holst (Denmark); L 0–2; 17–21, 14–21	Did not advance		
Chloe Magee	Women's singles	Tolmoff (Estonia); L 0–2; 18–21, 17–21	Šefere (Latvia); W 2–0; 21–9, 21–7	Tan (Belgium); W 2–1; 11–21, 22–20, 21–12	3	Did not advance				
Joshua Magee; Sam Magee	Men's doubles	Mogensen & Boe (Denmark); L 0–2; 21–17, 21–16	Â Silva & R Silva (Portugal); W 2–0; 21–13, 21–6	Florián & Kopřiva (Czech Republic); W 2–0; 21–16, 21–7	2 Q	—N/a	Dierickx & Golinski (Belgium); W 2–1; 23–21, 19–21, 21–14	Ivanov & Sozonov (Russia); L 0–2; 5–21, 9–21	Did not advance	3rd place, bronze medalist(s)
Rachel Darragh; Sara Boyle	Women's doubles	Lindholm & Nyström (Finland); L 0–2; 15–21, 15–21	Baumann & Fontaine (France); L 0–2; 19–21, 18–21	Bolotova & Kosetskaya (Russia); L 2–0; 21–9, 21–9	4	—N/a	Did not advance			
Chloe Magee; Sam Magee	Mixed doubles	Bartušis & Fomkinaitė (Lithuania); W 2–0; 21–8, 21–10	Cali & Sadowski (Malta); W 2–0; 21–3, 21–2	Bitman & Bášová (Czech Republic); W 2–1; 21–11, 19–21, 21–14	1 Q	—N/a	Pietryja & Wojtkowska (Poland); W 2–0; 21–18, 21–12	Mittelheisser & Fontaine (France); L 0–2; 15–21, 21–23	Did not advance	3rd place, bronze medalist(s)

== Basketball (3x3) ==
Ireland have qualified a women's team of four for the 3x3 Basketball competition because of results at the 2014 European 3x3 Championships.

Athlete	Event	Group Stages				Round of 16 Opposition Result	Quarterfinals Opposition Result	Semifinals Opposition Result	Final Opposition Result	Rank
Athlete	Event	Match 1 Opposition Result	Match 2 Opposition Result	Match 3 Opposition Result	Pool Rank	Round of 16 Opposition Result	Quarterfinals Opposition Result	Semifinals Opposition Result	Final Opposition Result	Rank
(Republic of Ireland); Ireland; Niamh Dwyer; Grainne Dwyer; Suzanne Maguire; Orla O'Reilly	Women's 3x3	Slovenia; L 10–14	Slovakia; W 20–12	Spain; L 11–21	3 Q	Czech Republic; W 17–13	Russia; L 15–21	Did not advance		5

== Boxing ==
Ireland has qualified boxers for the following events.

Men

Athlete	Event	Round of 32	Round of 16	Quarterfinals	Semifinals	Final	
Athlete	Event	Opposition Result	Opposition Result	Opposition Result	Opposition Result	Opposition Result	Rank
Brendan Irvine	49 kg	—N/a	Banabakov (Bulgaria); W 3–0	Alizada (Azerbaijan); W 2–1	Zamotayev (Ukraine) W 3–0	Sagaluev (Russia) L 2–1	2nd place, silver medalist(s)
Myles Casey	52 kg	Fihurenka (Belarus); W 3–0	Mamishzada (Azerbaijan); L 0–3	Did not advance			
Kurt Walker	56 kg	Nazirov (Russia); L 1–2	Did not advance				
Seán McComb	60 kg	Beliak (Ukraine); W 3–0	Cosenza (Italy); W 3–0	Yilmaz (Turkey); W 3–0	Selimov (Azerbaijan); L 0–3	Did not advance	3rd place, bronze medalist(s)
Dean Walsh	64 kg	—N/a	Dadashev (Russia); W 2–1	Sopa (Germany); L 3–0	Did not advance		
Adam Nolan	69 kg	Beqiri (Albania); W 3–0	Morelo (Italy); W 3–0	Kelly (United Kingdom); L 1–2	Did not advance		
Michael O'Reilly	75 kg	Vrgoc (Croatia); W 3–0	Sabotic (Montenegro); W 3–0	Venko (Slovenia); W 3–0	Koptyakov (Russia); W WO	Musalov (Azerbaijan); W 3–0	1st place, gold medalist(s)
Darren O'Neill	91 kg	Jinaru (Romania); W 3–0	Sinkevics (Latvia); W 3–0	Manukian (Ukraine) L 1–2	Did not advance		
Dean Gardiner	+91 kg	—N/a	Vianello (Italy); W 3–0	Yoka (France); L 0–3	Did not advance		

Women

Athlete	Event	Round of 16	Quarterfinals	Semifinals	Final	
Athlete	Event	Opposition Result	Opposition Result	Opposition Result	Opposition Result	Rank
Ceire Smith	51 kg	Johansen (Norway); W 3–0	Sagataeva (Russia); L 1–2	Did not advance		
Michaela Walsh	54 kg	Saveleva (Russia); L 0–3	Did not advance			
Katie Taylor	60 kg	Eliseeva (Bulgaria); W 3–0	Lundblad (Sweden); W 3–0	Alekseevna (Azerbaijan); W 2–1	Mossely (France); W 3–0	1st place, gold medalist(s)

== Canoeing ==
Athlete	Event	Heats		Semifinals		Final	
Athlete	Event	Time	Rank	Time	Rank	Time	Rank
Peter Egan; Simas Dobrovolskis	Men's K2 1000 m	3:49.417	7	3:38.587	9	Did not advance	
Peter Egan; Simas Dobrovolskis	Men's K2 200 m	35.048	7	Did not advance			
Tom Brennan	Men's K1 200 m	36.446	6	36.191	8	Did not advance	
Andrzej Jezierski	Men's C1 200 m	42.336	6	40.227	5	Did not advance	
Jennifer Egan	Women's K1 200 m	42.643	6	42.657	8	Did not advance	
Jennifer Egan	Women's K1 500 m	1:55.468	6	1:52.536	7	Did not advance	

== Cycling ==
Athlete	Event	Time	Rank
Ryan Mullen	Men's time trial	1:02:17.86	8
Ryan Mullen	Men's road race	DNF	–
Sean Downey	Men's road race	DNF	–
Eddie Dunbar	Men's road race	5:42:09	48
Jack Wilson	Men's road race	DNF	–
Conor Dunne	Men's road race	5:33:36	45
Caroline Ryan	Women's time trial	35:29.55	15
Caroline Ryan	Women's road race	DNF	–

== Diving ==
Ireland sent one diver to the games.

Athlete	Event	Preliminaries		Final	
Athlete	Event	Points	Rank	Points	Rank
Natasha McManus	Women's 1 m springboard	319.70	19	Did not advance	
Natasha McManus	Women's 3 m springboard	358.20	10 Q	381.50	10

== Gymnastics ==
=== Artistic ===
- Men's team – Kieran Behan, Rohan Sebastian, Daniel Fox
- Women's team – Ellis O'Reilly, Tara Donnelly, Nicole Mawhinney

== Judo ==
Athlete	Event	Round of 32	Round of 16	Quarterfinals	Semifinals	Repechage	Final / BM	
Athlete	Event	Opposition Result	Opposition Result	Opposition Result	Opposition Result	Opposition Result	Opposition Result	Rank
Eoin Fleming	73 kg	Vanlıoğlu (Turkey); L 000-100|	Did not advance					

== Karate ==
Athlete	Event	Group phase				Semifinal	Final / BM	
Athlete	Event	Opposition Score	Opposition Score	Opposition Score	Rank	Opposition Score	Opposition Score	Rank
Karen Dolphin	Women's Kata	Sánchez (ESP); L 5–0	Miskova (CZE); L 5–0	Scordo (FRA); L 5–0	4	Did not advance		

== Shooting ==
- Men's trap –

Ireland secured one quota in the shotgun events based on the European rankings on 31 December 2014.

Men

Athlete	Event	Qualification		Semi-final		Final	
Athlete	Event	Points	Rank	Points	Rank	Points	Rank
Derek Burnett	Men's trap	120	10	Did not advance			

== Swimming ==
- Women's 200 m freestyle – 1 quota place (Rachel Bethel)
- Women's 200 m breaststroke – 1 quota place (Mona McSharry)
- Women's 100 m backstroke – 1 quota place (Danielle Hill)
- Men's 100 m backstroke – 1 quota place (Rory McEvoy)
- Women's 400 m Individual Medley, 400 m Free and 1500 m Free (Katie Baguley)

== Taekwondo ==
Based on the WTF rankings as at 31 March 2015, Ireland secured one quota for the Games.

Athlete	Event	Round of 16	Quarterfinals	Semifinals	Repechage	Bronze medal	Final	
Athlete	Event	Opposition Result	Opposition Result	Opposition Result	Opposition Result	Opposition Result	Opposition Result	Rank
Chloe Aboud	Women's −67 kg	Johansson (SWE); L 6–14	Did not advance					=13

== Triathlon ==
Ireland had three quota places in the Triathlon events. Aileen Reid gained the best result, 6th, in the women's race.

Athlete	Event	Swim (1.5 km)	Trans 1	Bike (40 km)	Trans 2	Run (10 km)	Total time	Rank
Russell White	Men's triathlon	19:28	0:50	57:37	0:26	36:20	1:54:41	36
Aaron O'Brien	Men's triathlon	–	–	–	–	–	DNF	–
Aileen Reid	Women's triathlon	20:46	0:47	1:06:19	0:29	35:37	2:03:58	6

== Wrestling ==
Men's freestyle

Athlete	Event	Qualification	Round of 16	Quarterfinal	Semifinal	Repechage 1	Repechage 2	Final / BM	
Athlete	Event	Opposition Result	Opposition Result	Opposition Result	Opposition Result	Opposition Result	Opposition Result	Opposition Result	Rank
Soslan Tuaev	74 kg	BYE	DNC						
Alex Dolly	86 kg	Friev (ESP); L 4–0	Did not advance						
