= 2023 IBA World Boxing Championships – Light welterweight =

Light welterweight at the 2023 IBA World Boxing Championships
- Venue: Humo Arena
- Location: Tashkent, Uzbekistan
- Dates: 2–14 May
- Competitors: 58 from 58 nations

Medalists
gold medal	Ruslan Abdullaev	Uzbekistan
silver medal	Baatarsükhiin Chinzorig	Mongolia
bronze medal	Hovhannes Bachkov	Armenia
bronze medal	Bakhodur Usmonov	Tajikistan

The Light welterweight competition at the 2023 IBA Men's World Boxing Championships was held between 2 and 14 May 2023.

== Results ==
=== Finals ===
Semifinals
(Armenia) Hovhannes Bachkov	0
(Uzbekistan) Ruslan Abdullaev	5
(Tajikistan) Bakhodur Usmonov	1
(Mongolia) Baatarsükhiin Chinzorig	4

Final
(Uzbekistan) Ruslan Abdullaev	5
(Mongolia) Baatarsükhiin Chinzorig	0

=== Top half ===
==== Section 1 ====
Round of 64
(Japan) Yuta Akiyama	1
(Serbia) Aleksej Šendrik	4
(Paraguay) Facundo Forcado	0
(South Korea) Lee Jong-seung	5
(Turkey) Bilge Kağan Kanlı	4
(Azerbaijan) Malik Hasanov	3
(Nigeria) Ridwan Ige	5
(Jamaica) Daniel Hylton	0
(Nepal) Bhupendra Thapa	1
(Germany) Devrim Gökduman	4
(The Gambia) Omar Barry	4
(Kenya) Joseph Shigali	1
(Colombia) José Viáfara	4
(Chinese Taipei) Lai Chu-en	0

Round of 32
(Armenia) Hovhannes Bachkov	5
(Serbia) Aleksej Šendrik	2
(South Korea) Lee Jong-seung	0
(Turkey) Bilge Kağan Kanlı	5
(Nigeria) Ridwan Ige	3
(Germany) Devrim Gökduman	4
(The Gambia) Omar Barry
(Colombia) José Viáfara	ABD

Round of 16
(Armenia) Hovhannes Bachkov	5
(Turkey) Bilge Kağan Kanlı	0
(Germany) Devrim Gökduman	0
(Colombia) José Viáfara	5

Quarterfinals
(Armenia) Hovhannes Bachkov	5
(Colombia) José Viáfara	0

==== Section 2 ====
Round of 64
(El Salvador) Samuel Contreras	1
(Georgia (country)) Lasha Gagnidze	4
(Indonesia) Matius Mandiangan	0
(France) Lounes Hamraoui	5
(Ghana) Joseph Commey	3
(Hungary) Richárd Kovács	4
(Puerto Rico) Manuel Febus	0
(Uzbekistan) Ruslan Abdullaev	5
(Spain) Oier Ibarreche	5
(Moldova) Dmitri Galagoț	0
(Kazakhstan) Sanatali Toltayev	5
(Israel) Ahmad Shtiwi	2

Round of 32
(Algeria) Jugurtha Ait-Bekka	5
(Georgia (country)) Lasha Gagnidze	2
(France) Lounes Hamraoui	5
(Hungary) Richárd Kovács	0
(Uzbekistan) Ruslan Abdullaev	ABD
(Spain) Oier Ibarreche
(Kazakhstan) Sanatali Toltayev	2
(Mauritius) Richarno Colin	5

Round of 16
(Algeria) Jugurtha Ait-Bekka	1
(France) Lounes Hamraoui	4
(Uzbekistan) Ruslan Abdullaev	5
(Mauritius) Richarno Colin	0

Quarterfinals
(France) Lounes Hamraoui	1
(Uzbekistan) Ruslan Abdullaev	4

=== Bottom half ===
==== Section 3 ====
Round of 64
(Kyrgyzstan) Zhantoro Tashiev	5
(Eswatini) Thabiso Dlamini	0
(China) Wang Xiangyang	5
(Pakistan) Mohib Ullah	0
(Thailand) Khunatip Pidnuch	4
(Austria) Arsen Chabyan	1
(Tajikistan) Bakhodur Usmonov	5
(Tanzania) Alex Isendi	0
(Antigua and Barbuda) Alston Ryan	0
(Jordan) Obada Al-Kasbeh	5
(Panama) Christopher Simmons
(South Africa) John Masamba	w/o

Round of 32
(Russia) Gabil Mamedov	5
(Kyrgyzstan) Zhantoro Tashiev	0
(China) Wang Xiangyang	0
(Thailand) Khunatip Pidnuch	5
(Tajikistan) Bakhodur Usmonov	3
(Jordan) Obada Al-Kasbeh	0
(South Africa) John Masamba	1
(Morocco) Abdelhaq Nadir	4

Round of 16
(Russia) Gabil Mamedov	2
(Thailand) Khunatip Pidnuch	5
(Tajikistan) Bakhodur Usmonov	w/o
(Morocco) Abdelhaq Nadir

Quarterfinals
(Thailand) Khunatip Pidnuch	0
(Tajikistan) Bakhodur Usmonov	5

==== Section 4 ====
Round of 64
(Mongolia) Baatarsükhiin Chinzorig	5
(Australia) Max McChlery	0
(Lesotho) Qhobosheane Mohlerepe	1
(Cameroon) Mohamed Oumarou	3
(Belarus) Dzmitry Dziashkevich	3
(Turkmenistan) Hursand Imankulyýew	4
(Democratic Republic of the Congo) Fiston Mbaya Mulumba	4
(Bulgaria) Krasimir Dzhurov	3
(Cyprus) Alexandros Christodoulou	0
(Ethiopia) Mesfin Biru Kerala	5
(Mexico) César Morales	0
(Cuba) Lázaro Álvarez	5
(Trinidad and Tobago) Donnel Phillip	0
(Brazil) Yuri Falcão	5

Round of 32
(Mongolia) Baatarsükhiin Chinzorig	5
(Cameroon) Mohamed Oumarou	0
(Turkmenistan) Hursand Imankulyýew	1
(Democratic Republic of the Congo) Fiston Mbaya Mulumba	4
(Ethiopia) Mesfin Biru Kerala	0
(Cuba) Lázaro Álvarez	5
(Brazil) Yuri Falcão	4
(India) Shiva Thapa	3

Round of 16
(Mongolia) Baatarsükhiin Chinzorig	5
(Democratic Republic of the Congo) Fiston Mbaya Mulumba	0
(Cuba) Lázaro Álvarez	5
(Brazil) Yuri Falcão	0

Quarterfinals
(Mongolia) Baatarsükhiin Chinzorig	4
(Cuba) Lázaro Álvarez	1
