= Thitisan =

Thitisan is a given name. Notable people with the name include:

- Thitisan Goodburn (born 1999), Thai model and pageant titleholder
- Thitisan Panmod (born 2000), Thai amateur boxer
