= Daniel McFarlane =

Daniel McFarlane may refer to:

- Daniel McFarlane (athlete), Australian athlete in 1998 World Junior Championships in Athletics – Men's 4 × 400 metres relay
- Danny McFarlane (born 1972), Jamaican athlete
- Danny McFarlane (boxing referee) (born 1967)

== See also ==
- Dan McFarlan (1873–1924), American baseball pitcher
