= Boxing at the 2015 European Games – Men's 49 kg =

Boxing competitions

Men's light flyweight boxing at the 2015 European Games
- Venue: Baku Crystal Hall
- Date: 19–25 June
- Competitors: 11 from 11 nations

Medalists
gold medal	Bator Sagaluev	Russia
silver medal	Brendan Irvine	Ireland
bronze medal	Muhammed Ünlü	Turkey
bronze medal	Dmytro Zamotayev	Ukraine

The men's light flyweight 49 kg boxing event at the 2015 European Games in Baku was held from 19 to 25 June at the Baku Crystal Hall.

== Results ==
Round of 16
Brendan Irvine (IRL)	3
Tinko Banabanov (BUL)	0
David Alaverdian (ISR)	3
Artyom Aleksayan (ARM)	0
Bator Sagaluev (RUS)	3
Harvey Horn (GBR)	0

Quarterfinals
Salman Alizade (AZE)	1
Brendan Irvine (IRL)	2
Serge Neumann (GER)	0
Dmytro Zamotayev (UKR)	3
Muhammed Ünlü (TUR)	3
David Alaverdian (ISR)	0
Bator Sagaluev (RUS)	3
István Ungvári (HUN)	0

Semifinals
Brendan Irvine (IRL)	3
Dmytro Zamotayev (UKR)	0
Muhammed Ünlü (TUR)	0
Bator Sagaluev (RUS)	3

Final
Brendan Irvine (IRL)	1
Bator Sagaluev (RUS)	2
