= Bakhodur =

Bakhodur is a given name. Notable people with the name include:

- Bakhodur Usmonov (born 1997), Tajikistani boxer
