= Baatarsükhiin Chinzorig =

Mongolian boxer (born 1991)

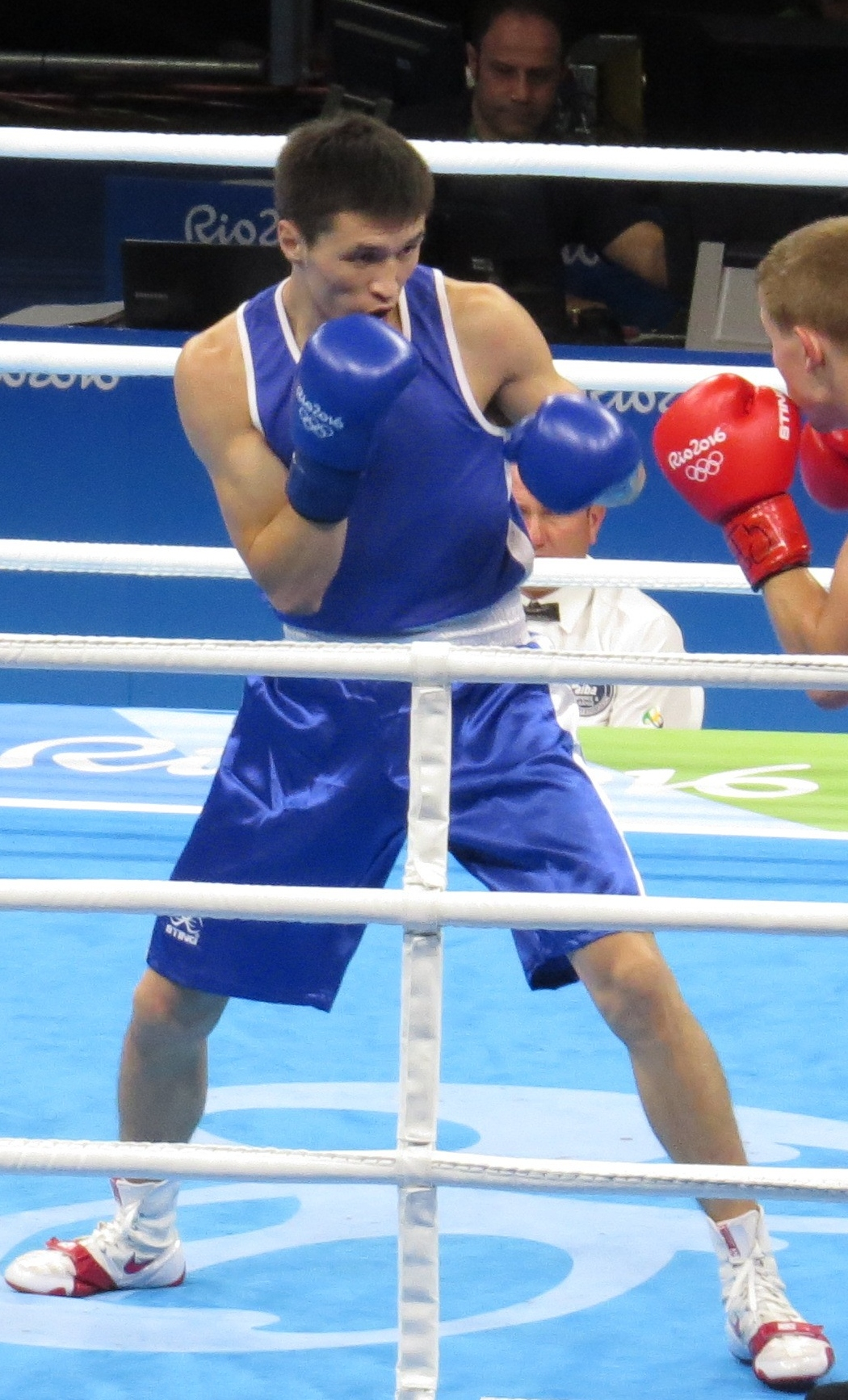
- Baatarsükh Chinzorig at the 2016 Olympics

Personal information
- Nationality: Mongolia
- Born: Баатарсүхийн Чинзориг; 21 September 1991 (age 35) Ulaanbaatar, Mongolia
- Height: 174 cm (5 ft 9 in)

Sport
- Country: Mongolia
- Sport: Amateur boxing
- Weight class: Light welterweight(64 kg)
- Coached by: D. Batsuren

Achievements and titles
- Olympic finals: 9th (2016)
- World finals: (silver) (2023)
- Regional finals: (gold) (2021) (gold) (2023)
Medal record
Men's amateur boxing
Representing Mongolia
World Championships
| Silver medal – second place | 2023 Tashkent | Light welterweight |
Asian Games
| Disqualified | 2022 Hangzhou | Light welterweight |
| Silver medal – second place | 2018 Jakarta | Light welterweight |
Asian Championships
| Gold medal – first place | 2021 Dubai | Light welterweight |
| Silver medal – second place | 2017 Tashkent | Light welterweight |
| Bronze medal – third place | 2019 Bangkok | Light welterweight |
| Bronze medal – third place | 2022 Amman | Welterweight |
World Military Championships
| Gold medal – first place | 2014 Almaty | Light welterweight |

Baatarsükhiin Chinzorig (Mongolian: Баатарсүхийн Чинзориг; born 21 September 1991) is a Mongolian amateur boxer. He competes in the light welterweight division in international tournaments. Chinzorig has won medals in the Asian Games and Asian Boxing Champions, winning won gold in the 2021 Asian Amateur Boxing Championships. Chinzorig competed in the light welterweight event at the 2016 Summer Olympics, but was eliminated in the second bout. Chinzorig also became World Military Champion in 2014.

He received the silver medal at the 2023 World Championships in the light welterweight event, defeating multiple Olympic medalist and World champion Lázaro Álvarez 4–1 in the quarterfinals.

He won the gold medal in the light welterweight event at the 2022 Asian Games which was held from 23 September to 8 October 2023 in China's Hangzhou, with victories over reigning World champion Ruslan Abdullaev, Yertugan Zeinullinov, reigning Asian Champion Bunjong Sinsiri, Lai Chu-en, each of them unanimous decision.

On 4 October 2023, Chinzorig tested positive for metandienone, a non-specified prohibited substance, according to the Prohibited List of the World Anti-Doping Agency (WADA).
