= Boxing at the 2022 Asian Games – Men's 51 kg =

Boxing competitions

Men's 51 kg at the 2022 Asian Games
- Venue: Hangzhou Gymnasium
- Date: 25 September – 5 October 2023
- Competitors: 28 from 28 nations

Medalists
gold medal	Hasanboy Dusmatov	Uzbekistan
silver medal	Thitisan Panmod	Thailand
bronze medal	So Chon-ryong	North Korea
bronze medal	Tomoya Tsuboi	Japan

The men's 51 kilograms (flyweight) event at the 2022 Asian Games took place from 25 September to 5 October 2023 at Hangzhou Gymnasium, Hangzhou, China.

== Schedule ==
All times are China Standard Time (UTC+08:00)

Date	Time	Event
Monday, 25 September 2023	14:00	Preliminaries – R32
Thursday, 28 September 2023	14:00	Preliminaries – R16
Tuesday, 3 October 2023	14:00	Quarterfinals
Wednesday, 4 October 2023	14:00	Semifinals
Thursday, 5 October 2023	19:00	Final

== Results ==
Legend

- KO — Won by knockout
- RSC — Won by referee stop contest
- RSCI — Won by referee stop contest injury

=== Final ===
Final
Thitisan Panmod (THA)	0
Hasanboy Dusmatov (UZB)	5

=== Top half ===
Preliminaries – R32
Daýanç Annaseýidow (TKM)	1
Abdulaziz Al-Atbi (KSA)	4
So Chon-ryong (PRK)	4
Azat Makhmetov (BRN)	0
Dio Koebanu (INA)	1
Rabin Thapa (NEP)	4
Mansour Khalefah (KUW)
Tu Po-wei (TPE)	RSC
Aaron Bado (PHI)
Thitisan Panmod (THA)	RSCI
Mehron Shafiev (TJK)
Zhang Jiamao (CHN)	RSC

Preliminaries – R16
Md Abu Talha (BAN)	1
Abdulaziz Al-Atbi (KSA)	4
So Chon-ryong (PRK)	5
Rabin Thapa (NEP)	0
Tu Po-wei (TPE)	1
Thitisan Panmod (THA)	4
Zhang Jiamao (CHN)	5
Nguyễn Minh Cường (VIE)	0

Quarterfinals
Abdulaziz Al-Atbi (KSA)
So Chon-ryong (PRK)	KO
Thitisan Panmod (THA)	5
Zhang Jiamao (CHN)	0

Semifinals
So Chon-ryong (PRK)	2
Thitisan Panmod (THA)	3

=== Bottom half ===
Preliminaries – R32
Deepak Bhoria (IND)	5
Abdul Qaiyum Ariffin (MAS)	0
Huthaifa Eshish (JOR)	0
Nurzhigit Diushebaev (KGZ)	5
Tenzin Drugyel (BHU)	2
Abdul Jabar Popalzai (AFG)	3
Saken Bibossinov (KAZ)	5
Orkhontungalagiin Önöbold (MGL)	0
Jo Se-hyeong (KOR)
Hasanboy Dusmatov (UZB)	RSCI
Vanesy Heuangthisouan (LAO)
Sultan Al-Nuaimi (UAE)	KO

Preliminaries – R16
Tomoya Tsuboi (JPN)	4
Deepak Bhoria (IND)	1
Nurzhigit Diushebaev (KGZ)	5
Abdul Jabar Popalzai (AFG)	0
Saken Bibossinov (KAZ)	1
Hasanboy Dusmatov (UZB)	4
Sultan Al-Nuaimi (UAE)	0
Zohaib Rasheed (PAK)	5

Quarterfinals
Tomoya Tsuboi (JPN)	5
Nurzhigit Diushebaev (KGZ)	0
Hasanboy Dusmatov (UZB)	5
Zohaib Rasheed (PAK)	0

Semifinals
Tomoya Tsuboi (JPN)	1
Hasanboy Dusmatov (UZB)	4
