= Boxing at the 2015 Pan American Games – Men's light flyweight =

Men's light flyweight at the 2015 Pan American Games
- Venue: Oshawa Sports Centre
- Dates: July 18–24
- Competitors: 10 from 10 nations

Medalists
Gold medal	Joselito Velázquez	Mexico
Silver medal	Joahnys Argilagos	Cuba
Bronze medal	Yoel Finol Rivas	Venezuela
Bronze medal	Victor Santillan	Dominican Republic

The men's light flyweight competition of the boxing events at the 2015 Pan American Games in Toronto, Ontario, Canada, was held between the 18 and 24 of July at the Oshawa Sports Centre. The defending champion is Joselito Velázquez of Mexico. Light flyweights is limited to those boxers weighing less than or equal to 49 kilograms.

Like all Pan American boxing events, the competition is a straight single-elimination tournament. Both semifinal losers are awarded bronze medals, so no boxers compete again after their first loss. Bouts consist of a 3 rounds "10-point must" scoring system used in the pro game, where the winner of each round must be awarded 10 points and the loser a lesser amount, and the elimination of the padded headgear. Five judges scored each bout. The winner will be the boxer who scored the most at the end of the match.

== Qualification ==
A total of ten boxers qualified to compete.

== Results ==
=== Bracket ===
Preliminaries; July 18, 2015
Yoel Finol Rivas (VEN)	3
P.G. Tondo (CAN)	0
Melik Elliston (USA)	0
Alvaro Vargas (GUA)	3

Quarterfinals; July 20, 2015
Yuberjen Martínez (COL)	0
Yoel Finol Rivas (VEN)	3
Kevin Arias (NCA)	0
Joahnys Argilagos (CUB)	2
Junior Zarate (ARG)	0
Victor Santillan (DOM)	3
Alvaro Vargas (GUA)	0
Joselito Velázquez (MEX)	3

Semifinals; July 22, 2015
Yoel Finol Rivas (VEN)	1
Joahnys Argilagos (CUB)	2
Victor Santillan (DOM)	0
Joselito Velázquez (MEX)	3

Finals; July 24, 2015
Joahnys Argilagos (CUB)	0
Joselito Velázquez (MEX)	3
