= Danny McFarlane (boxing referee) =

Personal information
- Nationality: British
- Born: Daniel McFarlane; 30 March 1967 (age 59) Sunderland, England
- Height: 6 ft 2 in (1.88 m)
- Weight: Heavyweight

Boxing career

Boxing record
- Total fights: 56 senior AOB boxing bouts
- Wins: 42

Daniel (Danny) McFarlane (born 30 March 1967) is a former boxer turned British AIBA boxing referee, whose most high-profile bout saw Shakur Stevenson (United States), take on Robeisy Ramirez (Cuba) in the Rio de Janeiro 2016 Olympic bantamweight final.

The 56 kg bantamweight final attracted enormous international coverage because Ramirez was the London 2012 Olympic gold champion, who had moved up a weight division, while Stevenson was an undefeated boxer of huge potential.

Ramirez won the fight by a narrow points margin to become a double gold medalist but Stevenson's defeat did not stop him being signed by boxing superstar Floyd Mayweather Jr. to a promotional agreement.

The final was one of 39 bouts McFarlane officiated in at the 2016 Olympiad - judging 32 and refereeing seven. He was the only boxing referee from the UK selected for the finals. He also served as a judge in the light-flyweight final won by Hasanboy Dusmatov, who went on to receive the Val Barker Trophy awarded to the best overall boxer in the tournament.

As well as the Olympics, McFarlane has refereed in the 2016 African qualifiers, 2015 Asian championships, the Middleweight 75 kg Final at the 2015 World Elite Men's Finals in Doha, the Heavyweight 91 kg Final at the 2014 Commonwealth Games in Glasgow (the only English boxing referee selected for the games), the 2013 University Games in Russia and 2012 Olympic qualifying events. He also refereed the heavyweight 91 kg final at the Commonwealth Games, (Canada v New Zealand) in 2014, and the middleweight 75 kg final at the 2015 World Elite Men's finals in Doha, Qatar, (Cuba v Uzbekistan).

== Career ==
McFarlane served in the Royal Marine commandos from 1987 to 1990 and was awarded the GPMG medal, as well as becoming the Commando Training Centre Royal Marines Boxing Heavyweight champion. He became a military ski instructor and was three-times deployed within the Arctic Circle. He was the 45 Commando boxing coach 1989-90.

He joined Northumbria Police in 1992 and in 1993 was a member of the British Police boxing team taking part in the World Police and Fire Games in Colorado Springs, USA. He won a gold medal in this tournament and in 1994 won a silver medal in the World Police Boxing Championships in Denver.

McFarlane fought in 56 senior contests both at domestic and international level, retiring in 2001 at the age of 34. He remains a serving police officer.

Danny summited Mont Blanc 4810 (French Alps) with his brother Shaun at 7 a.m. Wednesday 10 July 2018

== Refereeing ==
In 2001, the same year he retired as a boxer, McFarlane became a referee/judge with the Tyne, Tees and Wear Amateur Boxing Association.

In 2007 he became a European qualified boxing referee/judge and in 2010 he was a referee/judge in the Kings' Cup Multi-Nation Boxing Tournament in Bangkok, Thailand.

In 2011 McFarlane attended the Ahmet Comet Boxing Tournament in Istanbul, Turkey and was awarded his Three Star, international AIBA referee/judge badge. The same year he was invited to referee in the Commonwealth Youth Games in Douglas, Isle of Man, beginning a long list of major tournaments covered.

He has covered 78 international events to date and remains an official with Tyne, Tees and Wear Amateur Boxing Association, still refereeing in local events from amateur youth boxing upwards.

As a Three-star judge, McFarlane also gives talks and workshops to trainee referees on the AIBA rules.

== Personal ==
McFarlane lives in Sunderland with wife Deborah and son Jacob.
