= Zhomart Yerzhan =

Kazakhstani boxer (born 1993)

Personal information
- Native name: Жомарт Ержан
- Nationality: Kazakh
- Born: 10 June 1993 (age 33) Shymkent, Kazakhstan
- Height: 160 cm (5 ft 3 in)

Sport
- Country: Kazakhstan
- Sport: Boxing
- Event: Light flyweight
- Coached by: Myrzagali Aytzhanov (national)
Medal record
Men's boxing
Representing Kazakhstan
World Championships
Bronze medal – third place	2017 Hamburg	Light flyweight
Summer Universiade
Bronze medal – third place	2013 Kazan	Light flyweight
- Updated on 2 September 2017

Zhomart Yerzhan (Kazakh: Ержан Жомарт; born 10 June 1993) is a Kazakh light flyweight amateur boxer.

He reached the semifinals at the 2017 AIBA World Boxing Championships in the light flyweight category, where he lost to Joahnys Argilagos, earning a bronze medal.
