= 2017 AIBA World Boxing Championships – Light flyweight =

Boxing competitions

Light flyweight at the 2017 AIBA World Boxing Championships
- Venue: Alsterdorfer Sporthalle
- Location: Hamburg, Germany
- Dates: 25 August–2 September
- Competitors: 23 from 23 nations

Medalists
gold medal	Joahnys Argilagos	Cuba
silver medal	Hasanboy Dusmatov	Uzbekistan
bronze medal	Zhomart Yerzhan	Kazakhstan
bronze medal	Yuberjen Martínez	Colombia

The Light flyweight competition at the 2017 AIBA World Boxing Championships was held from 25 August to 2 September 2017.

== Draw ==
=== Final ===
Final
2 September
(Cuba) Joahnys Argilagos	3
(Uzbekistan) Hasanboy Dusmatov	2

=== Top half ===
First round
25 August
(Belarus) Yauheni Karmilchyk	0
(Puerto Rico) Oscar Collazo	5
25 August
(Kazakhstan) Zhomart Yerzhan	5
(Guatemala) Michael Tello	0
25 August
(Australia) Alex Winwood	3
(Algeria) Touareg Mohamed	2

Second round
27 August
(Cuba) Joahnys Argilagos	3
(Puerto Rico) Oscar Collazo	2
27 August
(Kenya) Shaffi Hassan	0
(Germany) Salah Ibrahim	5
27 August
(Philippines) Rogen Ladon	1
(Kazakhstan) Zhomart Yerzhan	4
27 August
(Australia) Alex Winwood	0
(Russia) Vasilii Egorov	5

Quarterfinals
29 August
(Cuba) Joahnys Argilagos	5
(Germany) Salah Ibrahim	0
29 August
(Kazakhstan) Zhomart Yerzhan	5
(Russia) Vasilii Egorov	0

Semifinals
31 August
(Cuba) Joahnys Argilagos	5
(Kazakhstan) Zhomart Yerzhan	0

=== Bottom half ===
First round
25 August
(England) Galal Yafai	5
(Scotland) Aqeel Ahmed	0
25 August
(Honduras) Bayron Molina	0
(Turkey) Muhammed Unlu	5
25 August
(India) Amit Panghal	4
(Italy) Federico Serra	1
25 August
(Costa Rica) Robinson Rodríguez	3
(Ukraine) Nazar Kurotchyn	2

Second round
27 August
(Colombia) Yuberjen Martínez	5
(England) Galal Yafai	0
27 August
(Turkey) Muhammed Unlu	0
(Mongolia) Gankhuyagiin Gan-Erdene	5
27 August
(Ecuador) Carlos Quipo	0
(India) Amit Panghal	5
27 August
(Costa Rica) Robinson Rodríguez	0
(Uzbekistan) Hasanboy Dusmatov	5

Quarterfinals
29 August
(Colombia) Yuberjen Martínez	5
(Mongolia) Gankhuyagiin Gan-Erdene	0
29 August
(India) Amit Panghal	0
(Uzbekistan) Hasanboy Dusmatov	5

Semifinals
31 August
(Colombia) Yuberjen Martínez	0
(Uzbekistan) Hasanboy Dusmatov	5
