= Boxing at the 2022 Asian Games – Men's 57 kg =

Boxing competitions

Men's 57 kg at the 2022 Asian Games
- Venue: Hangzhou Gymnasium
- Date: 26 September – 5 October 2023
- Competitors: 30 from 30 nations

Medalists
gold medal	Abdumalik Khalokov	Uzbekistan
silver medal	Shudai Harada	Japan
bronze medal	Lü Ping	China
bronze medal	Rujakran Juntrong	Thailand

The men's 57 kilograms event at the 2022 Asian Games took place from 26 September to 5 October 2023 at Hangzhou Gymnasium, Hangzhou, China.

== Schedule ==
All times are China Standard Time (UTC+08:00)

Date	Time	Event
Tuesday, 26 September 2023	14:00	Preliminaries – R32
Saturday, 30 September 2023	14:00	Preliminaries – R16
Tuesday, 3 October 2023	19:00	Quarterfinals
Wednesday, 4 October 2023	19:00	Semifinals
Thursday, 5 October 2023	19:00	Final

== Results ==
Legend

- KO — Won by knockout
- RSC — Won by referee stop contest
- RSCI — Won by referee stop contest injury
- WO — Won by walkover

=== Final ===
Final
Abdumalik Khalokov (UZB)	KO
Shudai Harada (JPN)

=== Top half ===
Preliminaries – R32
Carlo Paalam (PHI)	5
Mohammad Abu Jajeh (JOR)	0
Buddha Gyamjo Lama (NEP)	0
Nguyễn Văn Đương (VIE)	4
Lee Cheng-wei (TPE)	0
Abdumalik Khalokov (UZB)	5
Asri Udin (INA)	0
Sachin Siwach (IND)	5
Mohammad Edriss Jafari (AFG)	2
Turki Abuquthailah (KUW)	3
Lü Ping (CHN)	5
Danial Shahbakhsh (IRI)	0
Muhammad Qasim (PAK)	5
Nawwaf Al-Zahmi (UAE)	0

Preliminaries – R16
Munarbek Seitbek Uulu (KGZ)	1
Carlo Paalam (PHI)	4
Nguyễn Văn Đương (VIE)	0
Abdumalik Khalokov (UZB)	5
Sachin Siwach (IND)	WO
Turki Abuquthailah (KUW)
Lü Ping (CHN)	5
Muhammad Qasim (PAK)	0

Quarterfinals
Carlo Paalam (PHI)	0
Abdumalik Khalokov (UZB)	5
Sachin Siwach (IND)	1
Lü Ping (CHN)	4

Semifinals
Abdumalik Khalokov (UZB)	5
Lü Ping (CHN)	0

=== Bottom half ===
Preliminaries – R32
Mohammed Al-Qarnas (YEM)	0
Gantömöriin Lundaa (MGL)	5
Shudai Harada (JPN)	5
Ziyad Majrashi (KSA)	0
Salim Hossain (BAN)	3
Rukmal Prasanna (SRI)	2
Souliya Khammy (LAO)
Asror Vokhidov (TJK)	RSC
Tashi Yoezer (BHU)	0
Wasim Abusal (PLE)	5
Rujakran Juntrong (THA)	5
Rex Tso (HKG)	0
Lee Ye-chan (KOR)	0
Makhmud Sabyrkhan (KAZ)	5

Preliminaries – R16
Gantömöriin Lundaa (MGL)	1
Shudai Harada (JPN)	4
Salim Hossain (BAN)	RSCI
Asror Vokhidov (TJK)
Wasim Abusal (PLE)	0
Rujakran Juntrong (THA)	5
Makhmud Sabyrkhan (KAZ)	2
O Tae-bom (PRK)	3

Quarterfinals
Shudai Harada (JPN)	5
Salim Hossain (BAN)	0
Rujakran Juntrong (THA)	5
O Tae-bom (PRK)	0

Semifinals
Shudai Harada (JPN)	3
Rujakran Juntrong (THA)	2
