= Gary Antonio Russell =

American boxer

Personal information
- Born: 29 January 1993 (age 33) Capitol Heights, Maryland, U.S.
- Height: 5 ft 6 in (168 cm)
- Weight: Bantamweight, Super-bantamweight

Boxing career
- Stance: Orthodox

Boxing record
- Total fights: 24
- Wins: 22
- Win by KO: 13
- Losses: 1
- No contests: 1
Medal record
Men's amateur boxing
Representing United States
Golden Gloves
Gold medal – first place	2013 Salt Lake City	Bantamweight
Silver medal – second place	2014 Las Vegas	Bantamweight

Gary Antonio Russell (born 19 January 1993) is an American professional boxer. He has held the WBA interim super-bantamweight title since August 2026.

== Professional career ==
Russell twice reached the finals of Golden Gloves as an amateur, winning the gold medal in 2013 and finishing as a runner-up in 2014.

Russell made his professional debut against Harold Reyes on 31 January 2015. He won the fight by a second-round knockout. He amassed a 15–0 record during the next five years, winning 12 of those fights by way of stoppage. Russell had his first step-up in competition against Jesus Martinez on 8 February 2020, on the undercard of the WBC featherweight championship bout between Gary Russell Jr. and Tugstsogt Nyambayar. Gonzalez was disqualified in the sixth round for repeatedly hitting Russell low and holding in the fifth and sixth rounds. Russell was leading 50–45 on all three of the judges scorecards at the time of the stoppage.

Russell faced Juan Carlos Payano on 19 December 2020, on the undercard of the WBC interim featherweight title bout between Reymart Gaballo and his future opponent Emmanuel Rodríguez. He won the fight by a seventh-round technical decision, with scores of 59–55, 59–55 and 58–56. The fight was stopped at the very beginning of the seventh round, due to a cut above Payano's left eye, which was caused by an accidental head clash in the fifth round.

Russell faced the former IBF bantamweight champion, Emmanuel Rodríguez, on 14 August 2021, in a WBA bantamweight title eliminator, at the Dignity Health Sports Park in Carson, California. The fight was ruled a no decision after just 16 seconds. Referee Sharon Sands ruled that Rodriguez was unable to continue, due to a cut on the bridge of his nose which came from an accidental clash of heads. Russel fought once more in 2021, against Alexandro Santiago on 27 November 2021. He won the fight by majority decision, with scores of 95–95, 96–94 and 96–94.

Russel faced Emmanuel Rodríguez on 15 October 2022, in a WBA and IBF bantamweight title eliminator. The bout was a rematch of their 14 August 2021 fight, which ended in a no contest, due to a clash of heads in the opening round. Just like their first meeting, the fight was stopped when Rodríguez was unable to continue following an accidental clash of heads. However, this time the bout had reached the 10th round and therefore went to the judges to decide a winner. Russell lost by technical decision, with scores of 100–90, 99–91 and 99–93.

On 22 August 2026, he won the WBA interim super-bantamweight title by defeating defending champion Victor Santillan via unanimous decision at T-Mobile Arena in Paradise, Nevada, on 22 August 2026.

== Professional boxing record ==
24 fights	22 wins	1 loss
By knockout	13	0
By decision	9	1
No contests	1	

No.	Result	Record	Opponent	Type	Round, time	Date	Location	Notes
24	Win	22–1 (1)	Victor Santillan	UD	12	22 Aug 2026	T-Mobile Arena, Paradise, Nevada, U.S.	Won WBA interim super-bantamweight title
23	Win	21–1 (1)	Dervin Rodriguez	UD	8	15 Aug 2025	ProBox Event Center, Plant City, Florida, U.S.	
22	Win	20–1 (1)	Jaden Burnias	KO	4 (6), 1:11	19 Oct 2024	Caribe Royale Orlando, Orlando, Florida, U.S.	
21	Loss	19–1 (1)	Emmanuel Rodríguez	TD	10 (12), 0:02	15 Oct 2022	Barclays Center, New York City, U.S.	Rodriguez unable to continue after accidental headbutt
20	Win	19–0 (1)	Alexandro Santiago	MD	10	27 Nov 2021	Park Theater, Paradise, Nevada, U.S.	
19	NC	18–0 (1)	Emmanuel Rodríguez	NC	1 (12), 0:16	14 Aug 2021	Dignity Health Sports Park, Carson, California, U.S.	Rodríguez unable to continue after accidental headbutt
18	Win	18–0	Juan Carlos Payano	TD	7 (10), 0:01	19 Dec 2020	Mohegan Sun Casino, Uncasville, Connecticut, U.S.	
17	Win	17–0	Jesus Martinez	DQ	6 (8), 1:31	8 Feb 2020	PPL Center, Allentown, Pennsylvania, U.S.	
16	Win	16–0	Samuel Gutierrez Hernandez	TKO	1 (10), 2:01	2 Nov 2019	MGM National Harbor, Oxon Hill, Maryland, U.S.	
15	Win	15–0	Francisco Javier Pedroza	UD	10	13 Jul 2019	Minneapolis Armory, Minneapolis, Minnesota, U.S.	
14	Win	14–0	Saul Eduardo Hernandez	TD	6 (8), 2:38	18 May 2019	Barclays Center, New York City, U.S.	
13	Win	13–0	Jose Maria Cardenas	TKO	6 (8), 0:22	2 Mar 2019	Barclays Center, New York City, U.S.	
12	Win	12–0	Nick Otieno	KO	1 (8), 1:18	24 Aug 2018	Minneapolis Armory, Minneapolis, Minnesota, U.S.	
11	Win	11–0	Jonathan Lecona Ramos	TKO	5 (6), 0:16	19 May 2018	MGM National Harbor, Oxon Hill, Maryland, U.S.	
10	Win	10–0	Marco Antonio Mendoza Chico	KO	1 (6), 1:15	21 Nov 2017	Coliseum, St. Petersburg, Florida, U.S.	
9	Win	9–0	Christian Renteria	KO	3 (6), 1:26	19 Sep 2017	Sands Bethlehem Event Center, Bethlehem, Pennsylvania, U.S.	
8	Win	8–0	Jovany Fuentes	TKO	3 (6), 0:22	20 May 2017	MGM National Harbor, Oxon Hill, Maryland, U.S.	
7	Win	7–0	Rudolph Hedge	UD	6	28 Jun 2016	Sands Bethlehem Event Center, Bethlehem, Pennsylvania, U.S.	
6	Win	6–0	Alberto Serna	TKO	2 (6), 0:39	16 Apr 2016	Foxwoods Resort, Ledyard, Connecticut, U.S.	
5	Win	5–0	Eduardo Melendez	TKO	3 (6), 1:31	30 Oct 2015	The Venue at UCF, Orlando, Florida, U.S.	
4	Win	4–0	Manuel Rubalcava	KO	2 (6), 1:26	12 Sep 2015	Foxwoods Resort, Ledyard, Connecticut, U.S.	
3	Win	3–0	Jaxel Marrero	UD	4	11 Jul 2015	Yuengling Center, Tampa, Florida, U.S.	
2	Win	2–0	Brandon Garvin	TKO	1 (4), 1:03	23 May 2015	Agganis Arena, Boston, Massachusetts, U.S.	
1	Win	1–0	Harold Reyes	KO	2 (4), 2:10	31 Jan 2015	2300 Arena, Philadelphia, Pennsylvania, U.S.	
