= Victor Santillan =

Dominican boxer (born 1995)

Victor Santillán
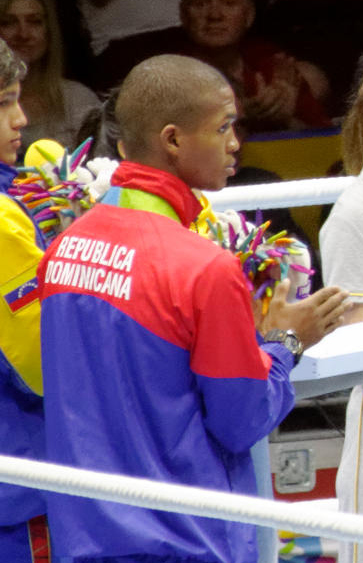
- Santillan at the 2015 Pan American Games

Personal information
- Born: Victor Daniel Santillán Pérez; 22 July 1995 (age 31) La Romana, Dominican Republic
- Height: 5 ft 5 1/2 in (166 cm)
- Weight: Light-flyweight; Bantamweight; Super-bantamweight

Boxing career
- Reach: 65 1/2 in (166 cm)
- Stance: Southpaw

Boxing record
- Total fights: 19
- Wins: 16
- Win by KO: 7
- Losses: 3
Medal record
Men's Amateur boxing
Representing Dominican Republic
Pan American Games
Bronze medal – third place	2015 Toronto	Light-flyweight

Victor Santillan Perez (born 22 July 1995) is a professional boxer from the Dominican Republic. He held the WBA interim super-bantamweight title in 2026. As an amateur Santillan won a bronze medal at the 2015 Pan American Games.

== Amateur boxing career ==
Santillan amassed an amateur record of 200 wins against 25 losses. His standout moment of success was winning a bronze medal in the light-flyweight category at the 2015 Pan American Games.

== Professional boxing career ==
Santillan made his professional debut against Louis Rios on 7 April 2018, winning the fight by first-round technical knockout. He amassed a 9–0 record before facing Jose Armando Valdes Bernal for the vacant WBA Fedecaribe bantamweight title on 15 May 2021, at the Gimnasio Estancio in Santo Domingo, Dominican Republic. He captured his first professional title by unanimous decision, with two scorecards of 96–93 and one scorecard of 98–92.

On 21 February 2026, Santillan won the vacant WBA interim super-bantamweight title with a third-round technical knockout of Noel Reyes Cepeda at Coliseo Carlos 'Teo' Cruz in Santo Domingo, Dominican Republic.

In his first defense, he lost the title to Gary Antonio Russell via unanimous decision at T-Mobile Arena in Paradise, Nevada, United States, on 22 August 2026.

== Professional boxing record ==
19 fights	16 wins	3 losses
By knockout	7	0
By decision	9	3

No.	Result	Record	Opponent	Type	Round, time	Date	Location	Notes
19	Loss	16–3	Gary Antonio Russell	UD	12	22 Aug 2026	T-Mobile Arena, Paradise, Nevada, U.S.	Lost WBA interim super-bantamweight title
18	Win	16–2	Noel Reyes Cepeda	TKO	3 (12), 1:13	21 Feb 2026	Coliseo Carlos 'Teo' Cruz, Santo Domingo, Dominican Republic	Won vacant WBA interim super-bantamweight title
17	Win	15–2	Alfree Ramirez	TKO	3 (10), 2:40	18 Oct 2025	San Cristóbal, Dominican Republic	
16	Loss	14–2	Tenshin Nasukawa	UD	10	8 Jun 2025	Ariake Arena, Tokyo, Japan	
15	Win	14–1	Alfree Ramirez	UD	10	28 Jun 2024	Pabellon de Esgrima, Santo Domingo, Dominican Republic	
14	Loss	13–1	Sho Ishida	SD	12	11 Jun 2023	Sumiyoshi Ward Center, Osaka, Japan	
13	Win	13–0	Renson Robles	TKO	6 (8), 0:05	16 Dec 2022	Pabellon de Esgrima, Santo Domingo, Dominican Republic	
12	Win	12–0	Carlos Caraballo	UD	8	11 Jun 2022	Hulu Theater, New York City, New York, U.S.	
11	Win	11–0	Manuel Gonzalez Garcia	TKO	6 (8), 0:41	8 Dec 2021	Cancha Venus Isabelita, Santo Domingo, Dominican Republic	
10	Win	10–0	Jose Armando Valdes Bernal	UD	10	15 May 2021	Gimnasio Estancio, Santo Domingo, Dominican Republic	Won vacant WBA Fedecaribe bantamweight title
9	Win	9–0	Kelvin Figaro	UD	6	17 Dec 2020	Hotel Catalonia Malecon Center, Santo Domingo, Dominican Republic	
8	Win	8–0	Luis Domingo Hernandez Cambero	UD	8	15 Dec 2019	Luxury Gran Stage, Jarabacoa, Dominican Republic	
7	Win	7–0	Jason Vera	UD	6	27 Sep 2019	Cancha Ruben Zayas Montanez, Trujillo Alto, Puerto Rico	
6	Win	6–0	Kelvin Figaro	KO	5 (6), 1:36	16 Mar 2019	Coliseo Carlos 'Teo' Cruz, Santo Domingo, Dominican Republic	
5	Win	5–0	Anyelo Munoz	RTD	2 (6), 3:00	15 Dec 2018	Coliseo Carlos 'Teo' Cruz, Santo Domingo, Dominican Republic	
4	Win	4–0	Christian Velez	MD	4	16 Nov 2018	Cancha Ruben Zayas Montanez, Trujillo Alto, Puerto Rico	
3	Win	3–0	Elliot De Jesus	UD	4	10 Aug 2018	Cancha Ruben Zayas Montanez, Trujillo Alto, Puerto Rico	
2	Win	2–0	Alex Diaz	UD	4	10 Aug 2018	East Martello Towers, Key West, Florida, U.S.	
1	Win	1–0	Louis Rios	TKO	1 (4), 2:37	7 Apr 2018	Complejo Ferial, Ponce, Puerto Rico	

== See also ==
- List of male boxers
- List of southpaw stance boxers

Sporting positions
Regional boxing titles
New title	WBA Fedecaribe bantamweight champion 14 May 2021 – 2021; Vacated	Vacant
World boxing titles
Vacant Title last held by Murodjon Akhmadaliev	WBA super-bantamweight champion Interim title 21 February 2026 – 22 August 2026	Succeeded by Gary Antonio Russell
