= Walter Sarnoi Oupathana =

American boxer

Walter Sarnoi
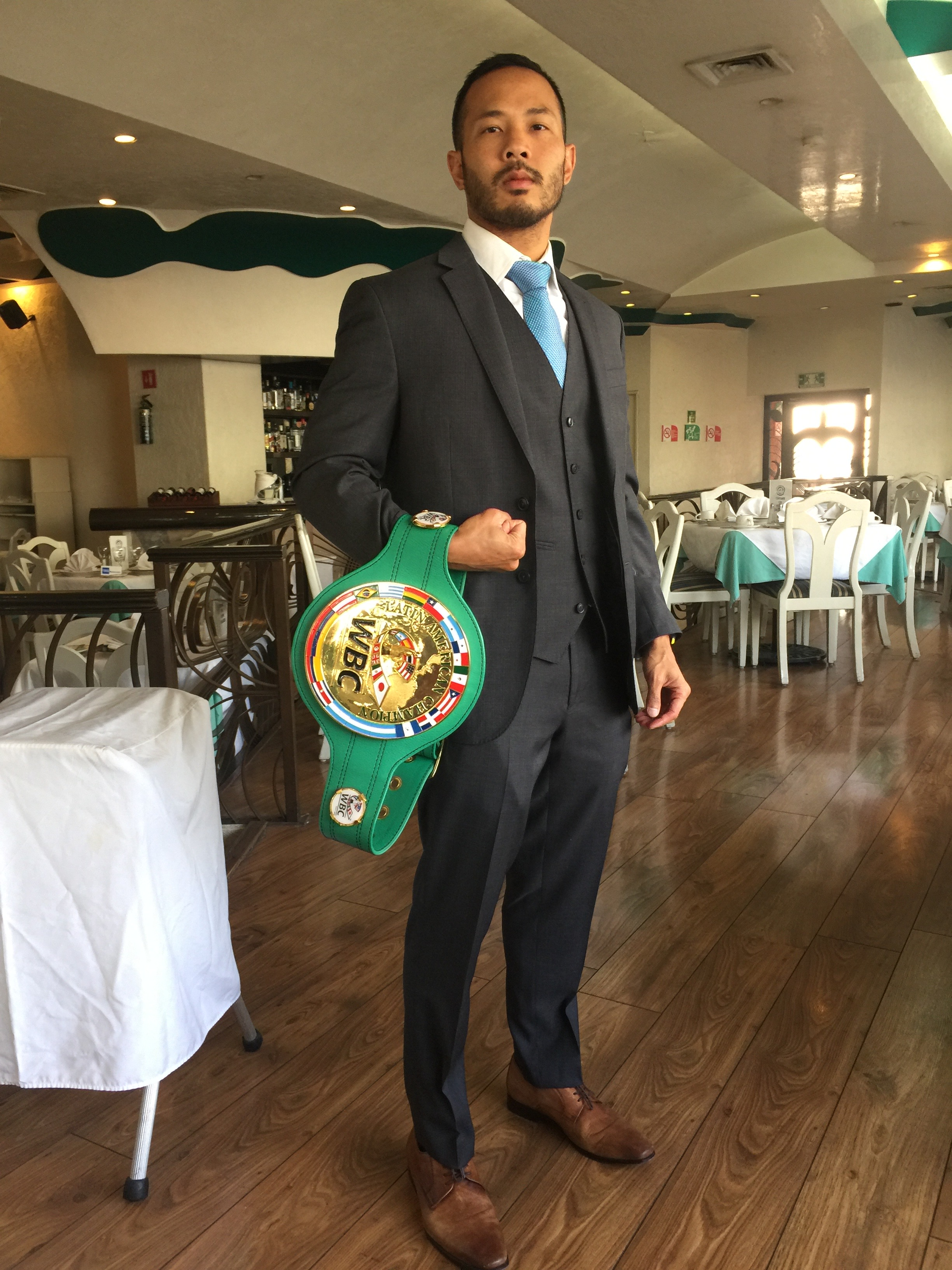

Personal information
- Nickname: School Boy
- Born: Walter Warawud Punriboon Sarnoi; June 23, 1986 (age 40) Monterey Park, California, Los Angeles, California, U.S.
- Height: 5 ft 7 in (170 cm)
- Weight: Featherweight; Super featherweight

Boxing career
- Stance: Orthodox

Boxing record
- Total fights: 29
- Wins: 25
- Win by KO: 16
- Losses: 4

Walter Sarnoi Oupathana (born June 23, 1986) is a Lao-American professional boxer. He represented Laos at the 2021 Asian Boxing Championships held in Dubai, United Arab Emirates, at the 2021 AIBA World Boxing Championships held in Belgrade, Serbia and, at the 2022 Asian Games held in Hangzhou Gymnasium, Hangzhou, China.

== Background ==
Sarnoi was born to a Lao-descent family, his father was a professional boxer from Thailand who fought against Fighting Harada. Sarnoi began his boxing career in 1999. In 2003, he won the silver medal at the US U19 National Championships and the silver medal at the 2005 US National Golden Gloves Tournament.

Sarnoi attended Northern Michigan University on a scholarship funded by the US Olympic Committee where he boxed for the university.

In 2018, Sarnoi earned the WBC interim Latino silver featherweight title. The bout took place in Jamay, Jalisco, Mexico.

In May 2021, Sarnoi competed at the 2021 Asian Amateur Boxing Championships representing Laos, the bout took place in the United Arab Emirates.

In October 2021, Sarnoi competed at the 2021 AIBA World Boxing Championships in Belgrade, Serbia in the 60 kg lightweight division representing The People’s Democratic Republic of Laos as the only representative competing for the country.

In May 2022, Sarnoi represented Laos at the 2021 Southeast Asian Games that took place from 16 to 22 May 2022 in Bắc Ninh, Vietnam at Bắc Ninh Gymnasium at the Men's Lightweight (63 kg) division.

In 2023, he competed at the 2022 Asian Games at Hangzhou Gymnasium, Hangzhou, China in the Men's 63.5 kg division representing The People’s Democratic Republic of Laos.

== Professional boxing record ==
| 29 fights | 25 wins | 4 losses |
|---|---|---|
| By knockout | 16 | 0 |
| By decision | 9 | 4 |

| No. | Result | Record | Opponent | Type | Round, time | Date | Location | Notes |
|---|---|---|---|---|---|---|---|---|
| 29 | Win | 25–4 | Geovani Sanchez Plascencia | TKO | 6 (10) | 2019-10-11 | Gimnasio de Usos Múltiples del Malecón, Ocotlán, Mexico | Won vacant WBC (USA) super-featherweight title |
| 28 | Win | 24–4 | Aramis Solis | TKO | 3 (8) | 2019-09-14 | Expo Oakland Mall, Guatemala City, Guatemala | |
| 27 | Win | 23–4 | Miguel Ángel González | SD | 10 (10) | 2019-05-25 | Poliforum, Ocotlán, Mexico | |
| 26 | Win | 22–4 | Edgar Puerta | TKO | 5 (10) | 2019-03-08 | Poliforum, Ocotlán, Mexico | |
| 25 | Win | 21–4 | Luis Carlos Lugo | TKO | 3 (10) | 2018-10-19 | Coliseo Luis Donaldo Colosio, Jamay, Mexico | Won vacant WBC Latino featherweight title |
| 24 | Win | 20–4 | Juan Lopez Esparza | UD | 8 (8) | 2018-09-01 | Salonsito Mexico, Jamay, Mexico | |
| 23 | Win | 19–4 | Alan Porras Cerna | TKO | 4 (8) | 2018-05-19 | Centro Civico de Ecatepec, Ecatepec de Morelos, Mexico | |
| 22 | Win | 18–4 | Ricardo Rodriguez | TKO | 3 (4) | 2017-07-01 | Auditorio Municipal, Jaltenco, Mexico | |
| 21 | Win | 17–4 | Armando Cardona Arevalo | UD | 8 (8) | 2016-04-30 | Plaza Principal, Jamay, Mexico | |
| 20 | Win | 16–4 | Sergio Najera | UD | 4 (4) | 2014-10-18 | StubHub Center, Carson, California, U.S. | |
| 19 | Win | 15–4 | Rosendo Álvarez | KO | 7 (8) | 2012-12-21 | Coliseo Luis Donaldo Colosio, Jamay, Mexico | |
| 18 | Win | 14–4 | David Albert Ramos | KO | 2 (8) | 2012-10-27 | Coliseo Luis Donaldo Colosio, Jamay, Mexico | |
| 17 | Win | 13–4 | Jose Reyes Ferrer | KO | 3 (8) | 2012-09-15 | Casino Mesón Real, Jamay, Mexico | |
| 16 | Loss | 12–4 | Christian Bojorquez | SD | 6 (6) | 2012-07-27 | Pechanga Resort & Casino, Temecula, California, U.S. | |
| 15 | Loss | 12–3 | Jonathan Alcantara | UD | 6 (6) | 2012-05-11 | Pechanga Resort & Casino, Temecula, California, U.S. | |
| 14 | Win | 12–2 | Jorge Castro | KO | 4 (6) | 2012-04-14 | Casino Mesón Real, Jamay, Mexico | |
| 13 | Win | 11–2 | Victor Valencia | KO | 7 (8) | 2012-02-18 | Discoteca Big Bang, Jamay, Mexico | |
| 12 | Win | 10–2 | Jose Angel Cota | UD | 6 (6) | 2012-01-13 | Pechanga Resort & Casino, Temecula, California, U.S. | |
| 11 | Loss | 9–2 | Francisco Gabriel Pina | UD | 8 (8) | 2011-09-15 | Auditorio Ernesto Rufo, Rosarito, Mexico | |
| 10 | Win | 9–1 | Jose Iniguez | TKO | 3 (6) | 2011-07-08 | Auditorio Municipal, Tijuana, Mexico | |
| 9 | Win | 8–1 | Hector Fuentes | TKO | 5 (6) | 2011-05-20 | Arena Jalisco, Guadalajara, Mexico | |
| 8 | Loss | 7–1 | Francisco Gabriel Pina | UD | 6 (6) | 2010-12-03 | Auditorio Municipal, Tijuana, Mexico | |
| 7 | Win | 7–0 | Eduardo Gomez | TKO | 3 (4) | 2010-10-30 | Men´s Club, Zapopan, Mexico | |
| 6 | Win | 6–0 | Adrian Aleman | MD | 4 (4) | 2010-05-08 | Home Depot Center, Carson, California, U.S. | |
| 5 | Win | 5–0 | Jerry Mondragon | UD | 4 (4) | 2010-03-05 | Pechanga Resort & Casino, Temecula, California, U.S. | |
| 4 | Win | 4–0 | John Lopez | UD | 4 (4) | 2009-08-14 | Omega Products International, Corona, California, U.S. | |
| 3 | Win | 3–0 | Alvaro Muro | UD | 4 (4) | 2009-02-27 | DoubleTree Hotel, Ontario, California, U.S. | |
| 2 | Win | 2–0 | Jonathan De Jesus | TKO | 1 (4) | 2008-10-24 | DoubleTree Hotel, Ontario, California, U.S. | |
| 1 | Win | 1–0 | Jesse Adame | TKO | 3 (4) | 2008-07-25 | Omega Products International, Corona, California, U.S. | |

== See also ==
- List of male boxers

Sporting positions
Regional boxing titles
| Vacant Title last held by Ruben Garcia Hernandez | WBC Latino featherweight champion October 19, 2018 – 2018; Vacated | Vacant Title next held by Keenan Carbajal |
| Vacant Title last held by Roberto Marroquin | WBC (USA) super-featherweight champion October 11, 2019 – 2019; Vacated | Vacant Title next held by Jordan White |
