= Joselito Velázquez =

Mexican boxer (born 1993)

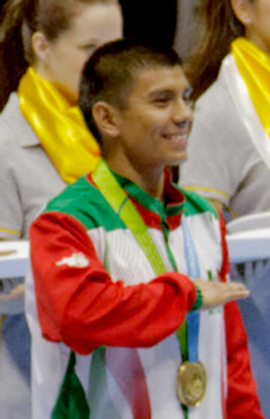
- Velázquez at the 2015 Pan American Games

Personal information
- Nickname: El Huracan (The Hurricane)
- Born: Joselito Velázquez Altamirano; 30 September 1993 (age 33) Santo Domingo Zanatepec, Oaxaca, Mexico
- Height: 5 ft 4 in (163 cm)
- Weight: Flyweight

Boxing career
- Reach: 58 in (147 cm)
- Stance: Orthodox

Boxing record
- Total fights: 21
- Wins: 19
- Win by KO: 12
- Losses: 1
- Draws: 1
Medal record
Men's amateur boxing
Representing Mexico
Pan American Games
Gold medal – first place	2011 Guadalajara	Light flyweight
Gold medal – first place	2015 Toronto	Light flyweight
Central American and Caribbean Games
Bronze medal – third place	2014 Veracruz	Light flyweight

Joselito Velázquez Altamirano (born 30 September 1993 in Santo Domingo Zanatepec) is a Mexican professional boxer. As an amateur, he won gold medals at the 2011 and 2015 Pan American Games, and represented Mexico at the 2016 Olympics.

== Early life ==
Velázquez was born in the city of Oaxaca, Mexico, but had to leave at the age of two because of his family's financial needs. He then moved with his family to Cancun, where he grew up. His father worked as a cab driver and a baker, while his mother worked at a daycare.

Velázquez was introduced to boxing through his older brother, who was a member of the Quintana Roo state boxing team. He decided to practice the sport after seeing his brother compete in a national tournament. Joselito also played soccer as a teenager. He was part of Cruz Azul's U-14 team. However, he could not make it to a professional level because of his slight build.

== Amateur career ==
Velázquez was the Pan American Games gold medalist in 2011 and 2015 in the light flyweight category. He defeated Cuban amateur world champions Yosvany Veitía and Joahnys Argilagos, respectively, in each competition's final match. Velázquez was the first athlete from Cancún to compete in the Olympic Games. Months before the 2016 Olympics, Velázquez suffered a dislocated shoulder that did not let him practice nor compete for two months. He was reportedly not healthy in the lead-up to the Olympics but he won the 2016 APB and WSB Olympic Qualifier to earn a spot. According to several analysts, he was part of the most talented generation of Mexican boxers at the amateur level. Velazquez won his first Olympic fight against Argentinian Leonardo Blanc. He'd lose in the next round against the eventual gold medalist, Uzbek Hasanboy Dusmatov.

As an amateur, Velázquez accrued a 138–40 record. Analysts see him as a technical boxer with speed in hands and legs, with ability to work in short distances. He's quoted Julio César Chávez as his role model.

== Professional career ==
Velázquez turned professional in October 2016. He is represented by Teiken Promotions. His manager is Frank Espinoza and he is coached by Francisco Bonilla. Velázquez ran into some controversy in his 4th pro bout, as the referee incorrectly gave Erick Zamora a count following a low blow from Velázquez. The referee declared the contest a KO win for the former Olympian, as Zamora squirmed in the floor in pain.

== Professional boxing record ==
21 fights	19 wins	1 loss
By knockout	12	0
By decision	7	1
Draws	1	

No.	Result	Record	Opponent	Type	Round, time	Date	Location	Notes
21	Win	19–1–1	Luis Araujo Arellano	UD	10	22 Mar 2024	Cancún, Mexico	
20	Win	18–1–1	Pablo Carrillo	UD	10	24 Nov 2023	Cancún, Mexico	
19	Win	17–1–1	Juan Toscano	KO	3 (8), 2:58	10 Jun 2023	Centro de Convenciones CEART, Mexicali, Mexico	
18	Win	16–1–1	Edgar Pulido Rodriguez	TKO	4 (6)	3 May 2023	El Domo del Code Jalisco, Guadalajara, Mexico	
17	Loss	15–1–1	Cristofer Rosales	UD	10	3 Dec 2022	Desert Diamond Arena, Glendale, Arizona, U.S.	
16	Win	15–0–1	Jose Soto	KO	6 (10), 1:56	7 May 2022	T-Mobile Arena, Las Vegas, Nevada, U.S.	
15	Win	14–0–1	Gilberto Mendoza	UD	8	6 Nov 2021	MGM Grand, Las Vegas, Nevada, U.S.	
14	Draw	13–0–1	Carlos Mejia	MD	8	29 May 2021	Grand Hotel, Tijuana, Mexico	
13	Win	13–0	Brandon Gallardo Vargas	UD	10	5 Sep 2020	Gimnasio TV Azteca, Mexico City, Mexico	
12	Win	12-0	Adrian Curiel Dominguez	UD	10)	30 Nov 2019	Arena La Paz, La Paz, Mexico	
11	Win	11–0	Francisco Bonilla	KO	4 (8), 2:54	14 Sep 2019	Dignity Health Sports Park, Carson, California, U.S.	
10	Win	10–0	Martin Tecuapetla	SD	8	22 Jun 2019	Ahualulco de Mercado, Mexico	
9	Win	9–0	Angel Guevara	TKO	4 (8), 2:28	6 Apr 2019	Arena Sonora, Hermosillo, Mexico	
8	Win	8–0	Kevin Villanueva	TKO	5 (8), 1:46	23 Feb 2019	Auditorio Municipal, Tijuana, Mexico	
7	Win	7–0	Jesus Cervantes Villanueva	RTD	2 (8), 3:00	10 Nov 2018	Auditorio Municipal, Tijuana, Mexico	
6	Win	6–0	Jose Flores Chanez	UD	6	8 Sep 2018	The Forum, Inglewood, California, U.S.	
5	Win	5–0	Armando Vazquez	TKO	5 (6), 1:27	9 Dec 2017	Mandalay Bay, Las Vegas, Nevada, U.S.	
4	Win	4–0	Erick Zamora	KO	2 (6), 1:36	30 Sep 2017	Arena Oasis, Cancún, Mexico	
3	Win	3–0	Rogelio Armenta	KO	1 (6), 1:09	16 Jun 2017	Salón Mezzanine, Tijuana, Mexico	
2	Win	2–0	Diego Guerrero	TKO	3 (6), 2:00	10 Mar 2017	Carpa Astros, Mexico City, Mexico	
1	Win	1–0	Eduardo Casimiro	KO	1 (4), 2:13	17 Dec 2016	Arena Oasis, Cancún, Mexico	
