= Shudai Harada =

Japanese boxer (born 2001)

Personal information
- Born: 2 October 2001 (age 24)
- Height: 5 ft 6 in (168 cm)

Sport
- Sport: Boxing
Medal record
Men's boxing
Representing Japan
Asian Games
Silver medal – second place	2022 Hangzhou	57 kg

Shudai Harada (born 2 October 2001) is a Japanese boxer. He won a silver medal at the 2022 Asian Games in the men's 57kg boxing event after a second-round KO from Abdumalik Khalokov. This led to Harada qualifying for the 2024 Summer Olympics through his silver at the Asian Games.

At the 2024 Summer Olympics, Harada competed in the men's 57kg boxing category. Harada won his first match against Yilmar Gonzalez in a 5-0 unanimous decision before losing his next bout to Javier Ibáñez.
