= Boxing at the 2015 European Games =

Boxing competitions

- Venue: Baku Crystal Hall
- Dates: 16–27 June
- Competitors: 278 (211 men, 67 women) from 40 nations

Boxing competitions at the 2015 European Games were held from 16 to 27 June 2015 at the Crystal Hall 3 venue in the main Games cluster in Baku. The competition consisted of ten weight events for men, and five for women, and was contested, as at the Olympic Games, under rules and formats set out by the AIBA.

Baku served as the first of two European qualification events for the AIBA World Boxing Championships, itself the largest qualification event for the 2016 Summer Olympics. The finalists, and the bronze medalist defeated by the eventual champion achieve one quota place for their country at the World Championships.

== Qualification ==
Nations are limited to one entry per weight division. Azerbaijan will have host nation positions available in each weight category

Qualification systems have not been finalised for the men's events, but should use the same format that has been adopted by the IOC, according to organisers.

In the women's events, the EUBC 2014 Women's European Amateur Boxing Championships in Bucharest, Romania will be the official qualification event after which European ranking will be established by 30 June 2014. If an NOC has more than one athlete in the top 14, the next best ranked NOC will get the allocation. 2 other place per weight category are reserved for 'universality' and host nominations.

== Medal summary ==
=== Men ===
Event	Gold	Silver	Bronze
49 kg	Bator Sagaluev; Russia	Brendan Irvine; Ireland	Muhammed Ünlü; Turkey Dmytro Zamotayev; Ukraine
52 kg	Elvin Mamishzada; Azerbaijan	Vincenzo Picardi; Italy	Hamza Touba; Germany Viliam Tankó; Slovakia
56 kg	Bakhtovar Nazirov; Russia	Dzmitry Asanau; Belarus	Tayfur Aliyev; Azerbaijan Qais Ashfaq; Great Britain
60 kg	Albert Selimov; Azerbaijan	Sofiane Oumiha; France	Seán McComb; Ireland Mateusz Polski; Poland
64 kg	Lorenzo Sotomayor; Azerbaijan	Vincenzo Mangiacapre; Italy	Viktor Petrov; Ukraine Kastriot Sopa; Germany
69 kg	Parviz Baghirov; Azerbaijan	Alexander Besputin; Russia	Josh Kelly; Great Britain Yaroslav Samofalov; Ukraine
75 kg	Michael O'Reilly; Ireland	Xaybula Musalov; Azerbaijan	Maxim Koptyakov; Russia Zoltán Harcsa; Hungary
81 kg	Teymur Mammadov; Azerbaijan	Valentino Manfredonia; Italy	Pavel Silyagin; Russia Oleksandr Khyzhniak; Ukraine
91 kg	Abdulkadir Abdullayev; Azerbaijan	Gevorg Manukian; Ukraine	Sadam Magomedov; Russia Josip Filipi; Croatia
+91 kg	Joe Joyce; Great Britain	Gasan Gimbatov; Russia	Tony Yoka; France Mahammadrasul Majidov; Azerbaijan

=== Women ===
Event	Gold	Silver	Bronze
51 kg	Nicola Adams; Great Britain	Sandra Drabik; Poland	Elif Coşkun; Turkey Saiana Sagataeva; Russia
54 kg	Elena Savelyeva; Russia	Marzia Davide; Italy	Anna Alimardanova; Azerbaijan Azize Nimani; Germany
60 kg	Katie Taylor; Ireland	Estelle Mossely; France	Yana Alekseevna; Azerbaijan Tasheena Bugar; Germany
64 kg	Anastasia Belyakova; Russia	Valentina Alberti; Italy	Sandy Ryan; Great Britain Aneta Rygielska; Poland
75 kg	Nouchka Fontijn; Netherlands	Anna Laurell Nash; Sweden	Sarah Scheurich; Germany Lidia Fidura; Poland

== Medal table ==
* Host nation (Azerbaijan)

Rank	Nation	Gold	Silver	Bronze	Total
1	Azerbaijan*	6	1	4	11
2	Russia	4	2	4	10
3	Ireland	2	1	1	4
4	Great Britain	2	0	3	5
5	Netherlands	1	0	0	1
6	Italy	0	5	0	5
7	France	0	2	1	3
8	Ukraine	0	1	4	5
9	Poland	0	1	3	4
10	Belarus	0	1	0	1
10	Sweden	0	1	0	1
12	Germany	0	0	5	5
13	Turkey	0	0	2	2
14	Croatia	0	0	1	1
14	Hungary	0	0	1	1
14	Slovakia	0	0	1	1
Totals (16 entries)		15	15	30	60
