= Dmytro Zamotayev =

Ukrainian boxer (born 1995)

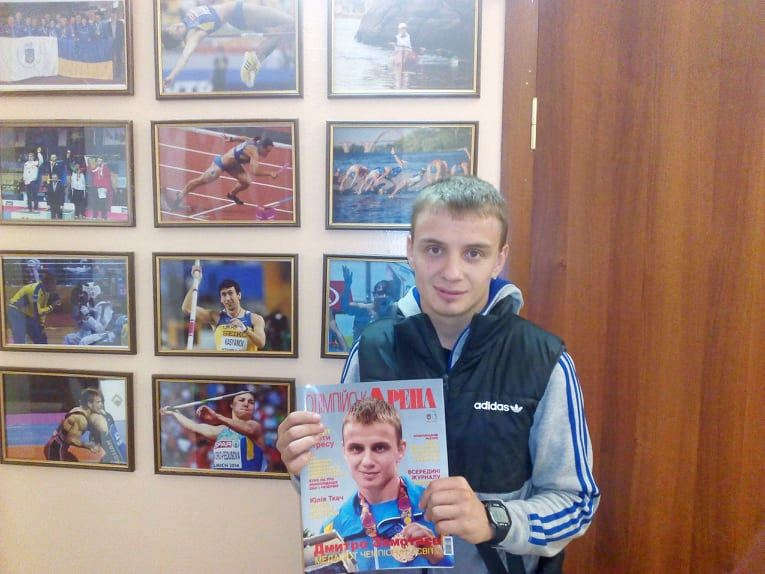

Personal information
- Nationality: Ukrainian
- Born: Дмитро Замотаєв; 4 April 1995 (age 31)
- Height: 1.68 m (5 ft 6 in)
- Weight: Light flyweight

Boxing career
Medal record
Men's amateur boxing
Representing Ukraine
World Championships
Bronze medal – third place	2015 Doha	Light flyweight
European Games
Bronze medal – third place	2015 Baku	Light flyweight
European Championships
Bronze medal – third place	2017 Kharkiv	Flyweight
Bronze medal – third place	2022 Yerevan	Flyweight

Dmytro Zamotayev (Дмитро Замотаєв; born 4 April 1995) is a Ukrainian amateur boxer in the Light flyweight division.

He won a bronze medal at the 2015 European Games.
