= Thitisan Panmod =

Thai boxer

Personal information
- Full name: ธิติสรรค์ ปั้นโหมด
- Nickname: Lerm
- Nationality: Thailand
- Born: December 5, 2000 (age 25) Sak Lek, Phichit, Thailand

Sport
- Sport: Boxing
- Weight class: Light Flyweight; Flyweight
Medal record
Asian Games
Silver medal – second place	2022 Hangzhou	Flyweight
Southeast Asian Games
Silver medal – second place	2025 Thailand	Flyweight
World Youth Amateur Championships
Gold medal – first place	2018 Bucharest	Light Flyweight

Thitisan Panmod (Thai: ธิติสรรค์ ปั้นโหมด; born 5 December 2000) is a Thai amateur boxer. As an amateur, he won 2018 AIBA Youth World Boxing Championships.

== Early life and Muay Thai career ==
Panmod (nicknamed Lerm; เหลิม) born in boxing family in Phichit, upper central Thailand. His father owned a small Muay Thai gym called "Sor. Sayan". He practiced Muay Thai for the first time when he was a student because he was angry at being bullied by his friends, with his father as a trainer. But his father took him to a local tournament, where he became the northern champion.

Then, two years later, he set his sights on boxing by attending the Phitsanulok Provincial Sports School and has started practicing amateur boxing ever since.

== Amateur career ==
He represented Thailand in AIBA Youth World Boxing Championships and defeated Puerto Rican boxer Jan Paul Rivera to win gold medal.

== 2020 Summer Olympics ==
For the 2020 Summer Olympics in Tokyo, Panmod has represented the Thailand national team in the 52 kg class (Flyweight) at the age of 19 and is one of just two of the Thai men's boxers (another one is senior Chatchai-decha Butdee). Unfortunately, shortly before the start of the competition. He also suffered a knee injury during a training session at a training camp in Saraburi, therefore requested to withdraw in the end.

== 2024 Summer Olympics ==
In the 2024 Summer Olympics in Paris, his fist Summer Olympics. He is considered the greatest hope of the Thailand national amateur boxing team, with a total of 8 boxers participating in the competition. Panmod competed in the men's 51 kg (Flyweight) division. In the first stage (round of 32), he was drawn to advance to the next stage. In the second stage (round of 16), Panmod was eliminated when he lost to Daniel Varela de Pina, a representative from Cape Verde 30–27, 30–27, 29–28, 29–28, and 28–29, total 4–1. What with, he could not compete with de Pina's agility and his physical condition was at a disadvantage.
