= Sultan Al-Nuaimi =

Emirati boxer (born 1993)

Sultan Al Nuaimi
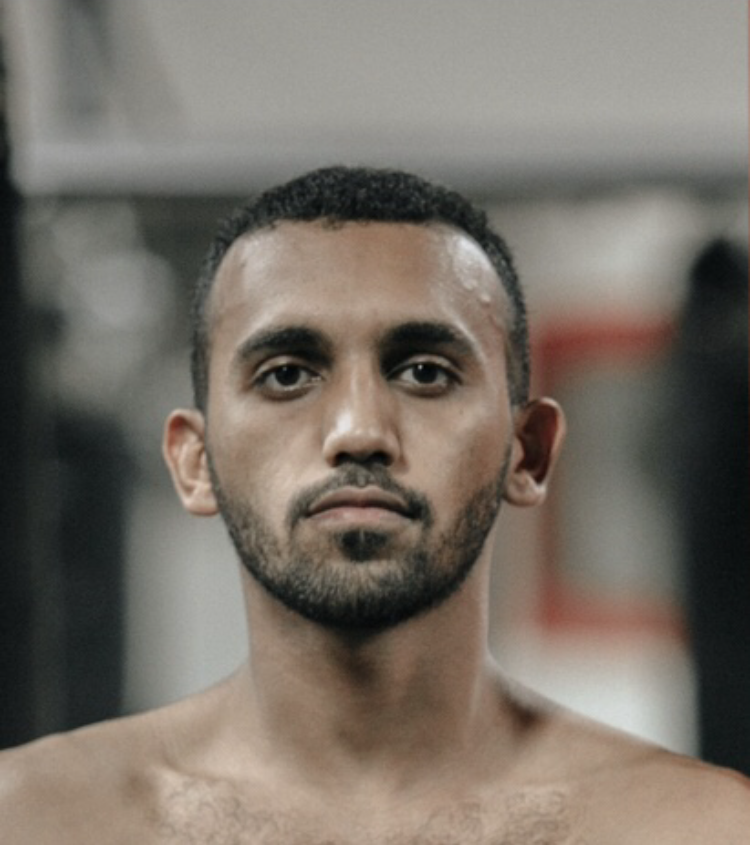
- Al Nuaimi in 2019

Personal information
- Born: Sultan Al Nuaimi; 19 July 1993 (age 33) Dubai, United Arab Emirates
- Height: 5 ft 6 in (168 cm)
- Weight: Super-flyweight

Boxing career
- Stance: Orthodox

Boxing record
- Total fights: 13
- Wins: 13
- Win by KO: 7
- Losses: 0

Sultan Al Nuaimi (Arabic: سلطان النعيمي; born 19 July 1993) is an Emirati Professional boxer. As an amateur, he is a two times national champion who represented United Arab Emirates at the 2018 Asian Games and he is representing his country at the 2021 AIBA World Boxing Championships to be qualified for 2020 Summer Olympics which will be held in Tokyo 2021 as a flyweight.
