= Hasanboy Dusmatov =

Uzbekistani professional boxer (born 1993)

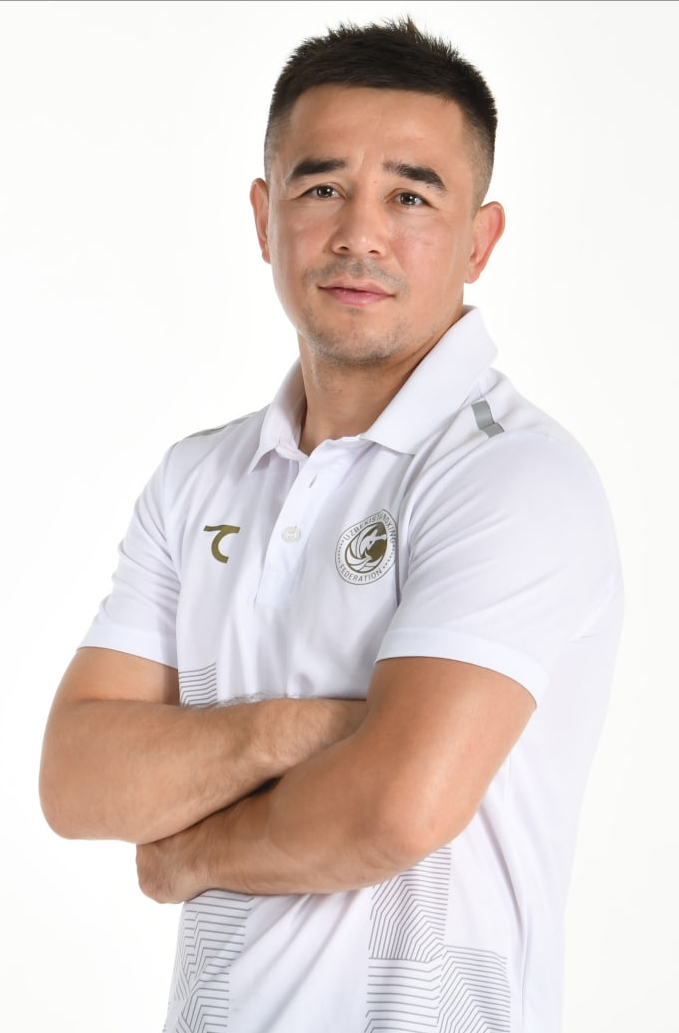
- Dusmatov in 2023

Personal information
- Nickname: Professor
- Born: Hasanboy Marfjon Ugli Dusmatov; 24 June 1993 (age 33) Andijan, Uzbekistan
- Height: 156 cm (5 ft 1 in)
- Weight: Light flyweight

Boxing career
- Coached by: Ziyatdinbek Toygonbaev
- Stance: Southpaw

Boxing record
- Total fights: 7
- Wins: 7
- Win by KO: 5
Medal record
Men's boxing
Representing Uzbekistan
Olympic Games
Gold medal – first place	2016 Rio Janeiro	Light flyweight
Gold medal – first place	2024 Paris	Flyweight
IBA World Championships
Gold medal – first place	2023 Tashkent	Flyweight
Gold medal – first place	2025 Dubai	Flyweight
Silver medal – second place	2017 Hamburg	Light flyweight
Asian Games
Gold medal – first place	2022 Hangzhou	Flyweight
Silver medal – second place	2018 Jakarta Palembang	Light flyweight
Asian Championships
Gold medal – first place	2015 Bangkok	Light flyweight
Gold medal – first place	2017 Tashkent	Light flyweight
Gold medal – first place	2022 Amman	Flyweight
Strandja Cup
Gold medal – first place	2022 Sofia	Flyweight
Summer Universiade
Gold medal – first place	2013 Kazan	Light flyweight

Hasanboy Marfjon Ugli Dusmatov (born 24 June 1993) is an Uzbek professional boxer. One of the most decorated amateur fighters of his generation, Dusmatov is a two time Olympic and World Championships gold medalist and three time Asian Championships gold medalist.

== Amateur career ==
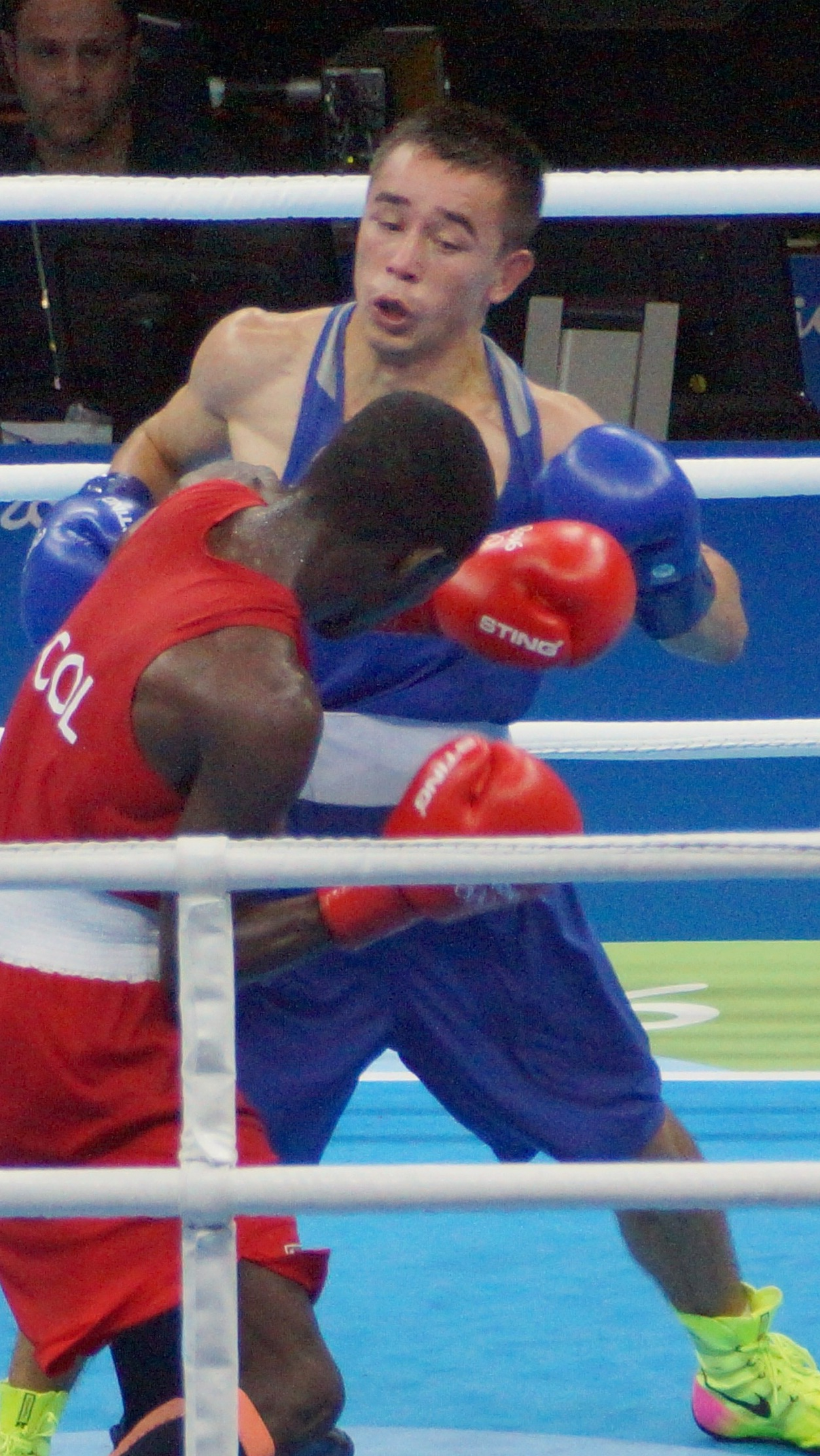
Dusmatov at the 2016 Rio Olympics

=== Olympic result ===
Rio 2016

- Round of 16: Defeated Joselito Velázquez (Mexico) 3–0
- Quarter-finals: Defeated Birzhan Zhakypov (Kazakhstan) 3–0
- Semi-finals: Defeated Nico Hernandez (United States) 3–0
- Final: Defeated Yuberjen Martínez (Colombia) 3–0

=== World Championships result ===
Hamburg 2017

- Round of 16: Defeated Robinson Rodríguez (Costa Rica) 5–0
- Quarter-finals: Defeated Amit Panghal (India) 5–0
- Semi-finals: Defeated Yuberjen Martínez (Colombia) 5–0
- Final: Defeated by Joahnys Argilagos (Cuba) 3–2

=== Asian Games result ===
Jakarta Palembang 2018

- Round of 16: Defeated Khamphouvanh Khamsathone (Loas) 5–0
- Quarter-finals: Defeated Mirlan Turkbai Uulu (Kyrgyzstan) 5–0
- Semi-finals: Defeated Wu Zhonglin (China) 5–0
- Final: Defeated by Amit Panghal (India) 3–2

== Professional career ==
=== Early career ===
On 16 November 2019, Dusmatov made his professional debut against Jesus Cervantes Villanueva of Mexico. Dusmatov won the bout after knocking Villanueva out with a heavy left hand to the body during the second round. Over a year after his debut, Dusmatov made his second appearance as a professional against Odiljon Sotkinov on 24 December 2020. Dusmatov dominated the bout from the outset and succeeded in knocking his opponent down four times on route to a knockout win in the opening round.

On 3 April 2021, Dusmatov fought against Muhsin Kizota. Dusmatov started the bout aggressively and dropped his opponent with a left hook during the opening minute of the first round. Kizota managed to recover from the knock down, however Dusmatov continued to pressure his opponent in the second round and landed another heavy left hand which put Kizota on the canvas for a second time. Despite Kizota once again rising back to his feet for a second time, Dusmatov immediately landed another heavy left hand which knocked his opponent down for a third time. This resulted in referee, Andriy Baliasov promptly ending the bout. Dusmatov was scheduled to face Jose Rivas on 17 December 2021. He won the fight by a fifth-round stoppage, as Rivas opted to retire from the fight at the end of the round. Dustamov knocked Rivas down with a right straight in the fourth round and began to take the fight over from that point onward.

== Professional boxing record ==
7 fights	7 wins	0 losses
By knockout	5	0
By decision	2	0

No.	Result	Record	Opponent	Type	Round, time	Date	Location	Notes
7	Win	7–0	Mark Antonio	UD	6	20 Jul 2025	Bishkek Arena, Bishkek, Kyrgyzstan	
6	Win	6–0	Siphamandla Baleni	UD	10	6 Nov 2023	Red Arena, Krasnaya Polyana, Russia	
5	Win	5–0	Moises Caro Gutierrez	TKO	3 (8), 0:30	21 May 2022	Centro de Convenciones CEART, Mexicali, Mexico	
4	Win	4–0	Jose Rivas	RTD	4 (10), 3:00	17 Dec 2021	Renaissance Hall, Tashkent, Uzbekistan	
3	Win	3–0	Muhsin Kizota	TKO	2 (10), 2:02	3 Apr 2021	Humo Arena, Tashkent, Uzbekistan	Won vacant WBA International light-flyweight title
2	Win	2–0	Odiljon Sotkinov	TKO	1 (6), 2:55	24 Dec 2020	Soviet Wings Sport Palace, Moscow, Russia	
1	Win	1–0	Jesus Cervantes Villanueva	TKO	2 (6), 1:58	16 Nov 2019	Plaza De Toros, San Miguel de Allende, Mexico	

Sporting positions
Regional boxing titles
New title	WBA International light-flyweight champion 3 April 2021 – present	Incumbent
