= Bhupendra Thapa =

Nepalese boxer

Bhupendra Thapa Magar is a Nepali professional boxer. He won the gold medal at 2019 South Asian Games held in Nepal. He represents Nepal Police Club.
