= Lai Chu-en =

Taiwanese boxer (born 1996)

Personal information
- Born: 23 July 1996 (age 29) Pingtung County, Taiwan

Sport
- Country: Taiwan
- Sport: Boxing
Medal record
Men's amateur boxing
Representing Chinese Taipei
Asian Games
Silver medal – second place	2022 Hangzhou	Light welterweight
Asian Championships
Bronze medal – third place	2022 Amman	Light welterweight

Lai Chu-en (Chinese: 賴主恩; born 23 July 1996) is a Taiwanese boxer. He competed in the men's lightweight competition at the 2016 Summer Olympics.

Lai was born in Pingtung County, and is of Paiwan ethnicity. His parents separated before he was born, leaving his mother to support him and his elder brother alone through her job as a nurse. He did not do well at school, and describes himself as having no direction in life until he decided to join the track team in middle school. He later took up boxing, and was admitted to the National Taiwan University of Physical Education and Sport.
