= Bakhodur Usmonov =

Tajikistani boxer (born 1997)

Personal information
- Native name: Баходур Бахромович Усмонов
- Born: 12 December 1997 (age 28) Dushanbe, Tajikistan
- Height: 1.74 m (5 ft 9 in)
- Weight: Light-welterweight, Lightweight

Boxing career

Boxing record
- Total fights: 13
- Wins: 12
- Win by KO: 5
- Losses: 1
Medal record
Men's amateur boxing
Representing Tajikistan
World Championships
Bronze medal – third place	2023 Tashkent	Light welterweight
Asian Championships
Gold medal – first place	2019 Bangkok	Light welterweight
Bronze medal – third place	2021 Dubai	Light welterweight
Bronze medal – third place	2022 Amman	Light welterweight

Bakhodur Usmonov (born 12 December 1997) is a Tajikistani professional boxer. As an amateur, he won a gold medal at the 2019 Asian Boxing Championships and competed at the 2020 and 2024 Summer Olympics.

== Amateur career ==
Usmonov won the light-welterweight gold medal at the 2019 Asian Championships and, using a change in regulations which allowed boxers who had limited professional contests to compete in amateur events, claimed bronze in the same weight division at the 2023 IBA World Championships.

== Professional career ==
Usmonov made his professional debut on 24 December 2020, defeating Vildan Minasov by majority decision over six rounds in Moscow, Russia, despite being knocked to the canvas in the first round.

On 23 May 2025, he won the vacant WBA Gold lightweight title with a third round knockout of Albert Pagara at the Tennis Palace and Water Sports Complex in Dushanbe, Tajikistan.

At the same venue on 22 July 2025, Usmonov defeated Christopher Mouafo via unanimous decision.

In his first 12-round contest, he recorded a majority decision win over Maxi Hughes at Duty Free Tennis Stadium in Dubai on 12 December 2025.

Usmonov lost his unbeaten professional record when he was stopped in the 12th and final round by Artur Subkhankulov at the Wrestling Palace in Ufa, Bashkortostan, Russia, on 24 April 2026. He was knocked to the canvas twice in the 10th round, once in the 11th and then a further time in the 12th, at which point the referee waved the fight off.

== Professional boxing record ==
13 fights	12 wins	1 loss
By knockout	5	1
By decision	7	0
Draws	0	

No.	Result	Record	Opponent	Type	Round, time	Date	Location	Notes
13	Loss	12–1	Artur Subkhankulov	TKO	12 (12), 2:22	24 Apr 2026	Wrestling Palace, Ufa, Bashkortostan, Russia	
12	Win	12–0	Maxi Hughes	MD	12	12 Dec 2025	Duty Free Tennis Stadium, Dubai, United Arab Emirates	
11	Win	11–0	Christopher Mouafo	UD	10	22 Jul 2025	Dushanbe, Tajikistan	Won vacant IBA Pro Intercontinental lightweight title
10	Win	10–0	Albert Pagara	KO	3 (10), 1:35	23 May 2025	Tennis Palace and Water Sports Complex, Dushanbe, Tajikistan	Won vacant IBA Pro Intercontinental lightweight title
9	Win	9–0	Nodirbek Soyibov	RTD	3 (8), 3:00	15 Mar 2025	RCC Boxing Academy, Ekaterinburg, Russia	
8	Win	8–0	Daud Alaev	UD	8	22 Jun 2024	RCC Boxing Academy, Ekaterinburg, Russia	
7	Win	7–0	Manat Sopatip	TKO	3 (10), 1:35	27 Oct 2023	Dushanbe, Tajikistan	Won vacant WBO Oriental lightweight title
6	Win	6–0	Artem Pugach	UD	8	17 Aug 2023	KRK “Uralets”, Ekaterinburg, Russia	
5	Win	5–0	Tikhon Netesov	TKO	4 (8), 2:27	17 Jun 2023	RCC Boxing Academy, Ekaterinburg, Russia	
4	Win	4–0	Dmitry Khasiev	RTD	4 (8), 3:00	28 Jan 2023	RCC Boxing Academy, Ekaterinburg, Russia	
3	Win	3–0	Tigran Uzlyan	UD	8	6 Aug 2022	RCC Boxing Academy, Ekaterinburg, Russia	
2	Win	2–0	Bektas Kassenay	UD	6	20 Mar 2021	Khodynka Ice Palace, Moscow, Russia	
1	Win	1–0	Vildan Minasov	MD	6	24 Dec 2020	USC Soviet Wings, Moscow, Russia	
