= Brendan Irvine =

Irish boxer (born 1996)

Personal information
- Nickname: Weerooster
- Nationality: Irish
- Born: Brendan Emmet Irvine; 17 May 1996 (age 30) Belfast, Northern Ireland
- Height: 1.65 m (5 ft 5 in)
- Weight: Flyweight

Boxing career
- Stance: Orthodox
Medal record
Representing Ireland
European Games
Silver medal – second place	2015 Baku	Light flyweight
European Championships
Bronze medal – third place	2017 Kharkiv	Flyweight
Representing Northern Ireland
Commonwealth Games
Silver medal – second place	2018 Gold Coast	Flyweight

Brendan Emmet Irvine (born 17 May 1996), nicknamed the "Wee Rooster", is an Irish amateur boxer from Belfast. He won a silver medal in the men's 49 kg division at the 2015 European Games, becoming the first ever medalist for Ireland at the Games. He moved up to the 52 kg weight class in 2016, winning another Irish senior title and also competing at the 2016 Olympic Games in Rio. In 2017, Irvine won another major medal for Ireland for the European Championships, finishing in top 3 taking away a bronze medal. The next year he went in to the CWG in the Gold Coast Australia, bagging another silver medal for NI. Inactive for 2019 with a few injuries he came back hungry as ever and qualified for the 2020 Olympic Games in Tokyo beating a tricky boxer from Hungary in the Europeans Olympic qualifier taking him to the top 8 spot. Brendan competed in the 2020 Olympics that had taken place in 2021 in Tokyo. Not only being the only double Olympian on the team, he was made joint flag bearer for Ireland along with team mate Kellie Harrington. Brendan lost his opening bout to Carlo Palm from Philippines who went on to take the silver medal.
