= Yuberjen Martínez =

Colombian boxer (born 1991)

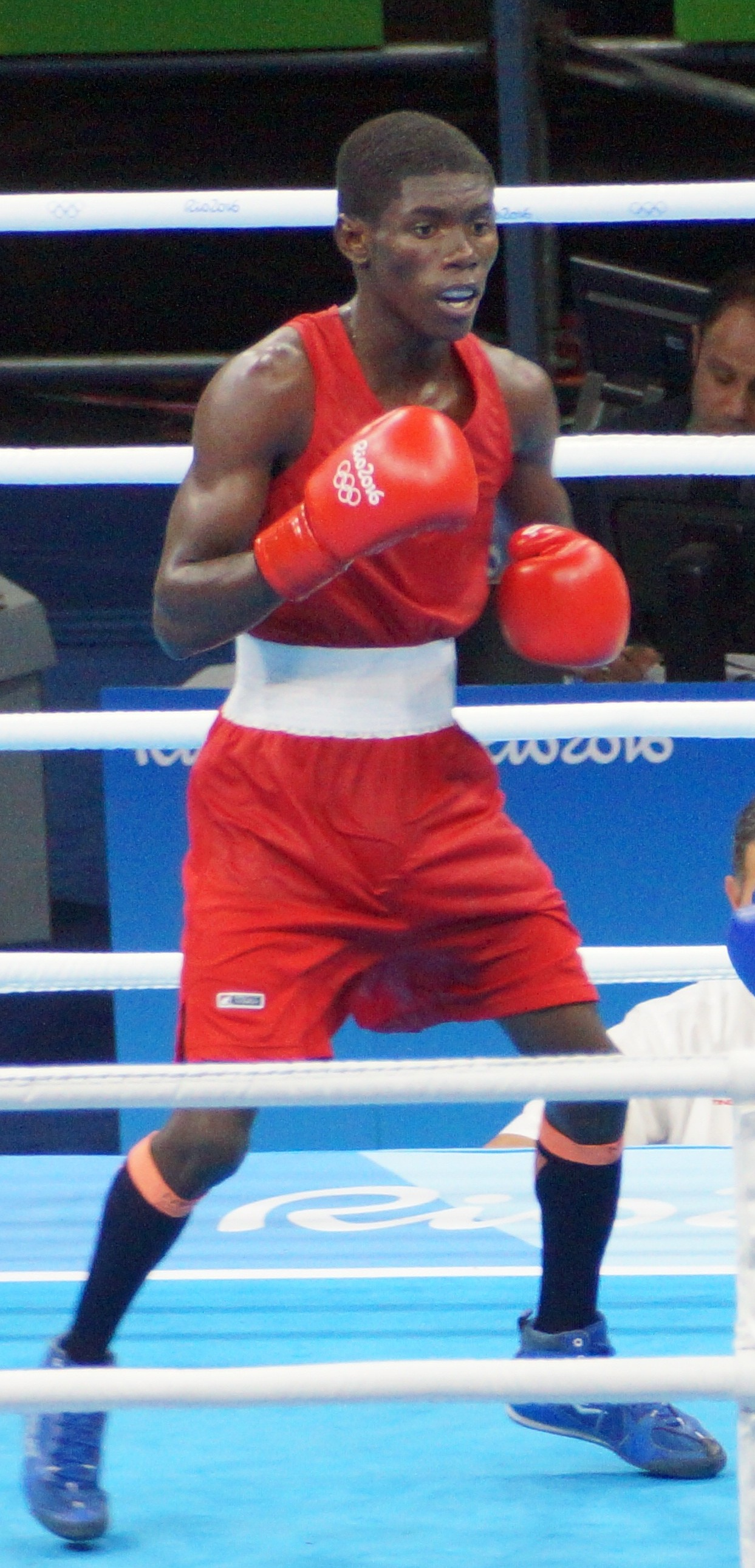
- Martínez at the 2016 Olympics

Personal information
- Nationality: Colombian
- Born: 1 November 1991 (age 35) Turbo, Colombia
- Height: 1.65 m (5 ft 5 in)

Boxing career

Boxing record
- Total fights: 8
- Wins: 7
- Win by KO: 7
- Losses: 1
Medal record
Representing Colombia
Men's amateur boxing
Olympic Games
Silver medal – second place	2016 Rio de Janeiro	Light flyweight
World Championships
Bronze medal – third place	2017 Hamburg	Light flyweight
Pan American Games
Silver medal – second place	2019 Lima	Light flyweight
Pan American Championship
Gold medal – first place	2017 Tegucigalpa	Light flyweight
Central American and Caribbean Games
Gold medal – first place	2018 Barranquilla	Light flyweight
Gold medal – first place	2023 San Salvador	Flyweight
Silver medal – second place	2014 Veracruz	Light flyweight
South American Games
Gold medal – first place	2018 Cochabamba	Light flyweight

Yurberjen Herney Martínez Rivas (born 1 November 1991) is a Colombian boxer. He won a silver medal in the light flyweight division at the 2016 Summer Olympics. In June 2021, he qualified to represent Colombia at the 2020 Summer Olympics; he decided that that would be the last Olympiad of his career. Martínez turned professional in 2022 and won his first seven fights by stoppage, before challenging WBO flyweight champion Anthony Olascuaga at Dignity Health Sports Park in Carson, California, United States, on 14 November 2026. He lost via unanimous decision.

== Professional boxing record ==
8 fights	7 wins	1 loss
By knockout	7	0
By decision	0	1

No.	Result	Record	Opponent	Type	Round, time	Date	Location	Notes
8	Loss	7–1	Anthony Olascuaga	UD	12	14 Nov 2026	Dignity Health Sports Park, Carson, California, U.S	For WBO flyweight title
7	Win	7–0	Angel Bethancourt	TKO	8 (10), 2:43	22 May 2026	Centro de Entrenamiento Tierra de Campeones Atheyna Bylon, Panama	Won vacant WBO Latino flyweight title
6	Win	6–0	Juan Aguero	KO	2 (6), 1:01	29 Oct 2025	Agora Convention Center, Bogota, Colombia	
5	Win	5–0	Alejandro Jair Sarabia Ortega	TKO	5 (8), 0:08	13 Sep 2025	Centro Comercial Carrera, Bogota, Colombia	
4	Win	4–0	Danoy Burgos	TKO	3 (6), 2:15	5 Oct 2024	Coliseo Elias Chegwin, Barranquilla, Colombia	
3	Win	3–0	Jose David Cogollo	TKO	4 (6), 1:25	24 Nov 2022	Barranquilla, Colombia	
2	Win	2–0	Jimson Garcia	KO	1 (8), 2:58	24 Sep 2022	Coliseo Elias Chegwin, Barranquilla, Colombia	Won vacant WBC Latino flyweight title
1	Win	1–0	Yeison Hernandez	KO	3 (6), 2:34	29 Jul 2022	Coliseo Elias Chegwin, Barranquilla, Colombia	

Olympic Games
Preceded by Pedro Causil	Flagbearer for Colombia; Tokyo 2020 with Caterine Ibargüen	Succeeded by Laura Gómez; Carlos Andres Quintana
