= Ruslan Abdullaev =

Uzbekistani boxer (born 2002)

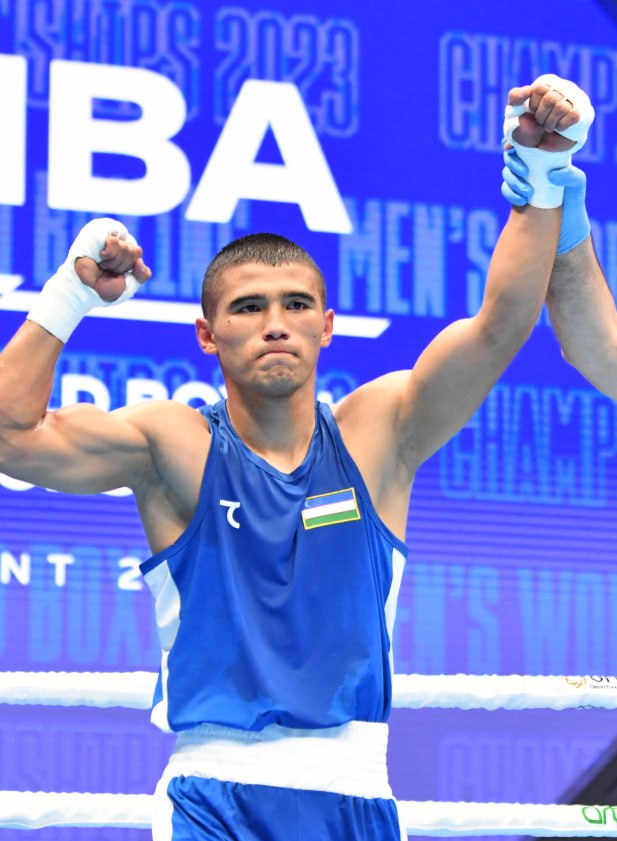

Personal information
- Nationality: Uzbek
- Born: 19 July 2002 (age 24) Qibray, Uzbekistan
- Height: 1.70 m (5 ft 7 in)
- Weight: Lightweight

Boxing career
- Stance: Orthodox
Medal record
Men's amateur boxer
Representing Uzbekistan
World Championships
| Gold medal – first place | 2023 Tashkent | Light welterweight |
Asian Championships
| Gold medal – first place | 2022 Amman | Light welterweight |

Ruslan Abdullaev (Uzbek: Руслан Абдyллаев, born 19 July 2002) is an Uzbekistani amateur boxer, who won a gold medal at the 2023 IBA Men's World Boxing Championships. He has been selected by Uzbekistan for the 2024 Summer Olympics.

== Biography ==
Ruslan Abdullaev was born in 2002 in Uzbekistan. He is an ethnic Kazakh. He comes from the Kulan Kipchaks clan.

== Professional boxing record ==
| 6 fights | 6 wins | 0 losses |
|---|---|---|
| By knockout | 4 | 0 |
| By decision | 2 | 0 |

| No. | Result | Record | Opponent | Type | Round, time | Date | Location | Notes |
|---|---|---|---|---|---|---|---|---|
| 6 | Win | 6–0 | Juan Meza Angulo | KO | 6 (8), 2:40 | Nov 20, 2026 | Fantasy Springs Casino, Indio, California, U.S. | |
| 5 | Win | 5–0 | Orestes Velázquez | KO | 5 (10), 1:30 | Jun 20, 2026 | Frontwave Arena, Oceanside, California, U.S. | |
| 4 | Win | 4–0 | Eduardo Javier Abreu | KO | 5 (8), 2:59 | Jan 16, 2026 | Acrisure Arena, Palm Desert, California, U.S. | |
| 3 | Win | 3–0 | Kevin Johnson | UD | 8 | Sep 20, 2025 | Fantasy Springs Casino, Indio, California, U.S. | |
| 2 | Win | 2–0 | Jino Rodrigo | UD | 8 | Apr 19, 2025 | Frontwave Arena, Oceanside, California, U.S. | |
| 1 | Win | 1–0 | José Valenzuela Alvarado | KO | 2 (4), 2:33 | Mar 6, 2025 | Fantasy Springs Casino, Indio, California, U.S. | |
