= National Register of Historic Places listings in Mingo County, West Virginia =

Location of Mingo County in West Virginia

This is a list of the National Register of Historic Places listings in Mingo County, West Virginia.

This is intended to be a complete list of the properties and districts on the National Register of Historic Places in Mingo County, West Virginia, United States. The locations of National Register properties and districts for which the latitude and longitude coordinates are included below, may be seen in a Google map.

There are 8 properties and districts listed on the National Register in the county.

This National Park Service list is complete through NPS recent listings posted March 21, 2025.

Contents: Counties in West Virginia

Barbour - Berkeley - Boone - Braxton - Brooke - Cabell - Calhoun - Clay - Doddridge - Fayette - Gilmer - Grant - Greenbrier - Hampshire - Hancock - Hardy - Harrison - Jackson - Jefferson - Kanawha - Lewis - Lincoln - Logan - Marion - Marshall - Mason - McDowell - Mercer - Mineral - Mingo - Monongalia - Monroe - Morgan - Nicholas - Ohio - Pendleton - Pleasants - Pocahontas - Preston - Putnam - Raleigh - Randolph - Ritchie - Roane - Summers - Taylor - Tucker - Tyler - Upshur - Wayne - Webster - Wetzel - Wirt - Wood - Wyoming

== Current listings ==
	Name on the Register	Image	Date listed	Location	City or town	Description
1	Coal House	Coal House	March 6, 1980 (#80004297)	2nd Ave. and Court St. 37°40′19″N 82°16′40″W	Williamson	
2	Hatfield Cemetery		November 28, 1980 (#80004033)	South of Newtown on County Route 6; 37°37′59″N 82°05′39″W	Newtown	
3	Matewan Historic District	Matewan Historic District	April 27, 1993 (#93000303)	Roughly bounded by McCoy Alley, Railroad Alley, Mate St. underpass and Warm Hollow to the head of the hollow 37°37′21″N 82°09′55″W	Matewan	
4	Mountaineer Hotel	Mountaineer Hotel	March 21, 1997 (#97000265)	31 E. 2nd Ave. 37°40′24″N 82°16′42″W	Williamson	
5	R. T. Price House		January 10, 1991 (#90001989)	2405 W. Third Ave. 37°40′36″N 82°18′05″W	Williamson	
6	Elven C. Smith House		August 22, 2002 (#02000899)	210 Little Oak St. 37°40′39″N 82°16′39″W	Williamson	
7	Williamson Field House		December 15, 2011 (#11000930)	1703 W. 3rd Ave. 37°40′40″N 82°17′32″W	Williamson	
8	Williamson Historic District	Williamson Historic District	November 15, 2006 (#06001045)	Roughly bounded by the Norfolk and Western railroad line, Pritchard, Popular, Park, Mulberry and Elm Sts. 37°40′31″N 82°16′30″W	Williamson	

== See also ==
- List of National Historic Landmarks in West Virginia
- National Register of Historic Places listings in West Virginia
