= Hassel T. Hicks =

American architect (1896–1952)

Hassel Thomas Hicks
- Born: October 27, 1896; Virginia
- Died: January 21, 1952 (aged 55); Welch, West Virginia
- Occupation: Architect

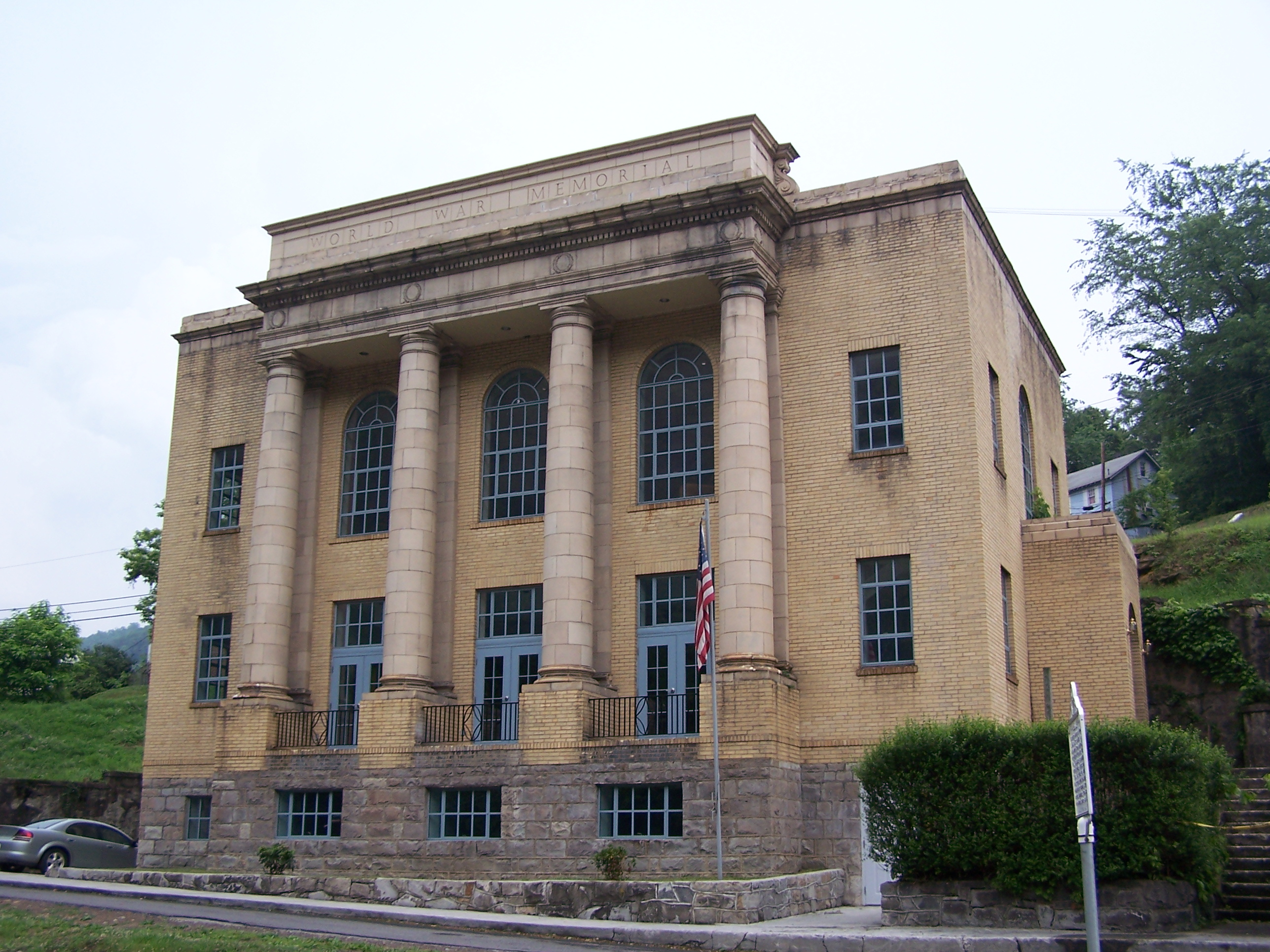
Memorial Building, Kimball, 1927.

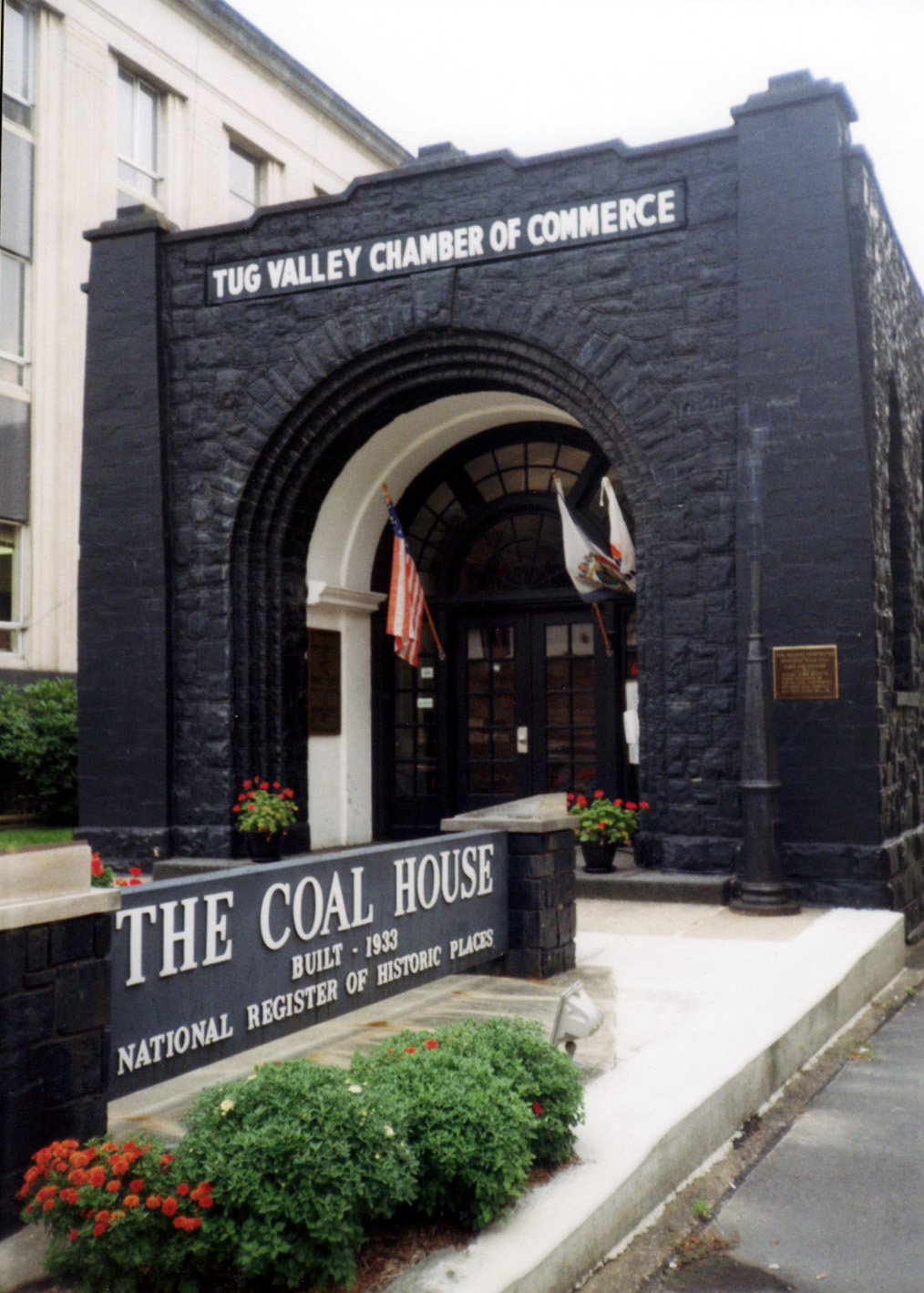
Coal House, Williamson, 1933.

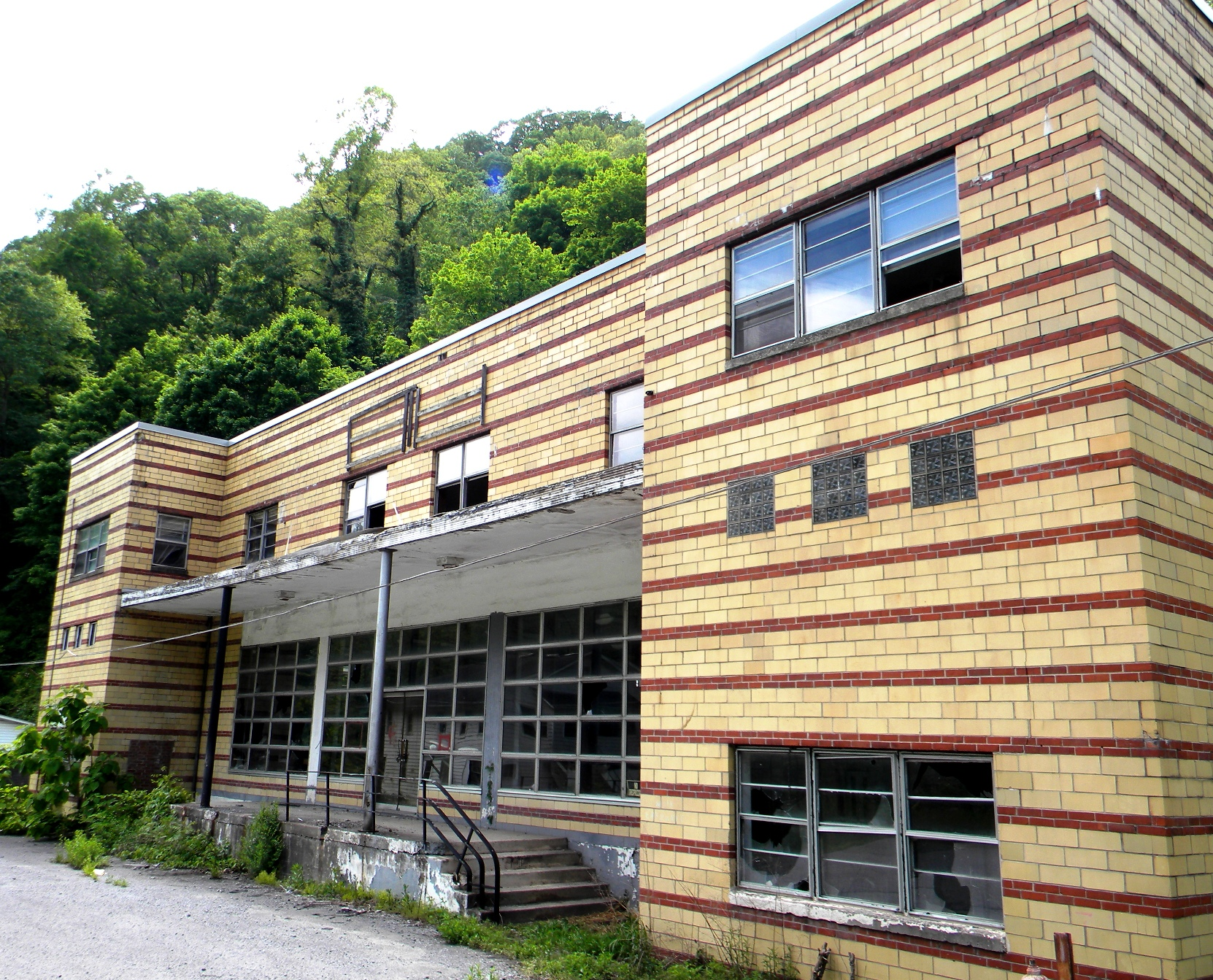
Company Store, Algoma, 1948.

Hassel T. Hicks (1896–1952) was an American architect from Welch, West Virginia.

== Life and career ==
Hassel Thomas Hicks was born in Virginia on October 27, 1896. After graduating high school, he spent one year at the Virginia Polytechnic Institute, and four more at the Virginia Military Institute. He worked for Virginia State Highway Commission before serving in World War I. After the war, he worked for the State Road Department in Mingo County, West Virginia, in the seat of Williamson. After a year with the state, he took an architectural position with local engineer David M. Good. In 1921 he joined the office of William P. Meiring as designing partner. The firm, Meiring, Hicks & Company, lasted until Hicks opened his own office the following year, 1922.

In his time at Williamson, Hicks saw the opportunities available at Welch, the seat of McDowell County. In 1924 he moved his office there, taking over the office of local architect A. E. Wolford in the McDowell County National Bank Building. In the 1930s Hicks hired Clio A. Vecellio as his chief assistant. Vecellio would later go on to established the firm of Vecellio & Kreps in Charleston in 1945. Hicks grew to be a prominent and respected architect, and served as vice president of the West Virginia chapter of the AIA during the 1940s.

He died in Welch on January 21, 1952.

== Legacy ==
After Hicks' death, Raymond J. Zando, his assistant since 1946, sold the practice to Martens & Son, a prominent Charleston firm. Martens kept Zando on to maintain a Welch office for the firm, a position which he held until 1959, when Martens & Son was dissolved. He moved to Charleston and founded Zando, Martin & Milstead, which would become one of the state's leading architectural firms.

Hicks was the architect of at least four buildings individually listed on the National Register of Historic Places, and at least two more contribute to listed historic districts. He designed many of West Virginia coal country's most significant buildings of the 20th century.

== Works ==
- 1926 – Kasdin Brothers Store, Main St, Kimball, West Virginia
- 1926 – Rhodes Realty Building, 95–97 McDowell St, Welch, West Virginia
- 1927 – World War Memorial Building, 178 One Way St, Kimball, West Virginia
  - Placed on the NRHP in 1993.
- 1929 – Stevens Clinic Hospital (former), 795 Virginia St, Welch, West Virginia
- 1933 – Coal House, 100 E 3rd Ave, Williamson, West Virginia
  - Placed on the NRHP in 1980.
- 1933 – St. Peter R. C. Church, 111 Virginia Ave, Welch, West Virginia.
  - Remodeled in 1969 by Zando, Martin & Milstead.
- 1937 – Clinch Valley Clinic Hospital, 2949 W Front St, Richlands, Virginia
  - Demolished in 1983.
- 1938 – Elven C. Smith House, 210 Little Oak St, Williamson, West Virginia
  - Placed on the NRHP in 2002.
- 1938 – Welch High School Gymnasium, Maple Ave, Welch, West Virginia
- 1940 – Municipal Parking Building, 59 McDowell St, Welch, West Virginia
- 1944 – McDowell County Vocational School, 1 Stadium Dr, Welch, West Virginia
- 1948 – Algoma Coal and Coke Company Store, Coke Oven Rd, Algoma, West Virginia
  - Placed on the NRHP in 1992.
- 1950 – First Methodist Church, 125 Virginia Ave, Welch, West Virginia
