= Nick Kisner =

American boxer

Personal information
- Nickname: Slick
- Born: Nicholas Ryan Kisner; January 17, 1991 (age 35) Baltimore, Maryland, U.S.
- Height: 5 ft 11 in (180 cm)
- Weight: Cruiserweight (200 lb); Regional Rankings: USBA #6; NABF #18

Boxing career
- Reach: 77.5 in (197 cm)
- Stance: Orthodox

Boxing record
- Total fights: 34
- Wins: 23
- Win by KO: 7
- Losses: 9
- Draws: 1
- No contests: 1

Nicholas Ryan Kisner (born January 17, 1991) is an American professional boxer.

== Early life ==
Kisner was born in Baltimore, Maryland. He is of Bavarian/Scottish descent on his father's side and Irish/Chechen descent on his mother's side. He grew up in South Baltimore and Northern Anne Arundel County. He began boxing at 6 years old under the tutelage of his father, a former boxer himself. He graduated from Old Mill Senior High School.

== Amateur career ==
As an amateur boxer he accomplished three National Silver Gloves Championships, two Junior National Golden Gloves Championships, Junior Olympic gold medal, Ringside World Championship, Ohio State Fair Championship, Under-19 National Championship, and a National Pal Championship, where he defeated 2012-2016 Olympian Cam Awesome (formally Lenroy Thompson) in the finals.

In 2009, he captured a silver medal at the US Men's National Championships, giving him a position on the USA Men's International team. In 2008, he reached the quarter finals at both the National Golden Gloves and the AIBA Youth World Championships in Guadalajara, Mexico. At the latter, he was defeated by 2012 and 2016 Olympic bronze medalist Ivan Dychko of Kazakhstan 5–1.

== Professional career ==
Shortly after winning the silver medal at the US Men's National Championships, Kisner decided to turn professional. Kisner made his debut January 31, 2010, against world ranked kickboxer, Francois Ambang.

He went 12–0–1 in his first 13 matches before losing a split decision against fellow undefeated boxer Junior Wright. In 2015, he lost a competitive, 10-round decision on CBS sports network to former World title challenger, and boxing superstar Lateef Kayode. Several fights later, he defeated ranked contender Brian Holstein in Columbus, Ohio to capture the WBA USA National Championship title.

In 2017, Kisner traveled to Belgium to fight Ryad Merhy in a match for the WBA Intercontinental title, losing in the fourth round.

In 2018, Kisner defended his title in a rematch against Brian Holstein in Columbus, Ohio. A few months later, he then fought against USBA #15 contender Scott Sigmon in a 10-round bout, for the NABP Cruiserweight Championship in July 2018. Kisner went on to win a 10-round decision in the bout, to capture the North American Boxing Partners (NABP) Cruiserweight title.

In April 2019, Kisner moved up to the heavyweight division to challenge European champion Otto Wallin on Showtime. The fight was called a no contest after the first round after Kisner suffered a cut over his right eye from a headbutt from Wallin early in the first round.

He then in February 2020 dropped back down to the cruiserweight division to take on undefeated Sam Crossed for the Maryland state cruiserweight title in a highly anticipated local fight. Due to the Maryland State Boxing Commission still keeping the cruiserweight limit at the original weight of 190 lbs, Kisner weighed in at a career low of 190 lbs, for the state title fight. Kisner went on to dominate Crossed over 10 rounds to collect the state title.

It was then announced later in the year of 2020, Kisner would challenge then champion Beibut Shumenov for the WBA Cruiserweight World Championship in December. The fight was later on postponed, and then the fight was cancelled shortly after that.

== Professional boxing record ==
34 fights	23 wins	9 losses
By knockout	7	6
By decision	16	3
Draws	1	
No contests	1	

No.	Result	Record	Opponent	Type	Round, time	Date	Location	Notes
34	Loss	23–9–1 (1)	Lyubomyr Pinchuk	TKO	2 (10), 1:09	Feb 7, 2026	Priory Grand Hall, Pittsburgh, Pennsylvania, U.S.	
33	Loss	23–8–1 (1)	Imran Haddabah	TKO	1 (8), 1:13	Apr 25, 2025	OCC Road House And Museum, Clearwater, Florida, U.S.	
32	Win	23–7–1 (1)	Edier Corredor	TKO	1 (6), 1:39	Jul 25, 2024	Club La Pradera, Carmen de Apicalá, Colombia	
31	Loss	22–7–1 (1)	Scott Sigmon	TKO	2 (10), 3:00	Jun 3, 2023	Augusta Expoland, Fishersville, Virginia, U.S.	For vacant WBC USA cruiserweight title
30	Loss	22–6–1 (1)	Johnnie Langston	TKO	5 (10), 1:40	Jan 29, 2022	Packard Music Hall, Warren, Ohio, U.S.	For vacant WBA-NABA cruiserweight title
29	Win	22–5–1 (1)	Samuel Crossed	UD	10	Feb 28, 2020	Maryland Live! Casino, Hanover, Maryland, U.S.	Won vacant Maryland cruiserweight title
28	Loss	21–5–1 (1)	Danny Kelly	TKO	2 (6), 1:04	Oct 18, 2019	Maryland Live! Casino, Hanover, Maryland, U.S.	
27	NC	21–4–1 (1)	Otto Wallin	NC	1 (10), 3:00	Apr 13, 2019	Boardwalk Hall, Atlantic City, New Jersey, U.S.	No contest after Kisner was cut by an accidental headbutt
26	Win	21–4–1	Scott Sigmon	MD	10	Jul 28, 2018	Hollywood Casino, Columbus, Ohio, U.S.	
25	Win	20–4–1	Brian Holstein	UD	10	Mar 3, 2018	Hollywood Casino, Columbus, Ohio, U.S.	Retained WBA-NABA USA cruiserweight title
24	Loss	19–4–1	Ryad Merhy	KO	4 (12), 2:30	Dec 16, 2017	Spiroudome Arena, Charleroi, Belgium	For WBA Inter-Continental cruiserweight title
23	Win	19–3–1	Lamont Singletary	SD	8	Mar 30, 2017	Michael's Eighth Avenue, Glen Burnie, Maryland, U.S.	
22	Win	18–3–1	Brian Holstein	MD	10	Nov 23, 2016	Hollywood Casino, Columbus, Ohio, U.S.	Won vacant WBA-NABA USA cruiserweight title
21	Win	17–3–1	Steven Tyner	UD	4	Jul 16, 2016	Roar on the Shore, Erie, Pennsylvania, U.S.	
20	Loss	16–3–1	Lamont Capers	SD	8	May 27, 2016	Claridge Hotel and Casino, Atlantic City, New Jersey, U.S.	
19	Win	16–2–1	Daniel Shull	UD	6	Apr 9, 2016	ABC Sports Complex, Springfield, Virginia, U.S.	
18	Win	15–2–1	James Jones	TKO	4 (4), 0:40	Mar 11, 2016	Serbian American Cultural Center, Weirton, West Virginia, U.S.	
17	Loss	14–2–1	Lateef Kayode	UD	10	May 29, 2015	W.C. Handy Park Pavilion, Memphis, Tennessee, U.S.	
16	Win	14–1–1	Marlon Hayes	UD	6	Mar 28, 2015	ABC Sports Complex, Springfield, Virginia, U.S.	
15	Win	13–1–1	Pedro Martinez	UD	4	Jul 18, 2014	Hanover Armory, Hanover, Pennsylvania, U.S.	
14	Loss	12–1–1	Junior Anthony Wright	SD	6	Aug 16, 2013	Guaranteed Rate Field, Chicago, Illinois, U.S.	
13	Win	12–0–1	Willie Chisolm	UD	4	May 11, 2013	Club One Fitness, Millersville, Maryland, U.S.	
12	Win	11–0–1	Jermaine Walker	UD	6	Dec 8, 2012	Williamson Field House, Williamson, West Virginia, U.S.	
11	Win	10–0–1	Rayshawn Myers	UD	4	Aug 19, 2011	Du Burns Arena, Baltimore, Maryland, U.S.	
10	Win	9–0–1	DeLeon Tinsley	UD	6	May 21, 2011	Maryland Sportsplex, Millersville, Maryland, U.S.	
9	Draw	8–0–1	Andre Ward	SD	4	Apr 23, 2011	D.C. Star Nightclub, Washington, D.C., U.S.	
8	Win	8–0	Leo Bercier	UD	4	Apr 15, 2011	Maryland Sportsplex, Millersville, Maryland, U.S.	
7	Win	7–0	James Pratt	KO	1 (4)	Feb 5, 2011	Sports Center, Charlotte, North Carolina, U.S.	
6	Win	6–0	Kenneth Farr	TKO	2 (4), 1:05	Oct 16, 2010	Wilson Parks and Recreation, Wilson, North Carolina, U.S.	
5	Win	5–0	Robert Hunt	TKO	2 (4)	Sep 18, 2010	Boo Williams Sportsplex, Hampton, Virginia, U.S.	
4	Win	4–0	Tauheed Wheeler	UD	4	Jun 17, 2010	Du Burns Arena, Baltimore, Maryland, U.S.	
3	Win	3–0	Octavius Davis	KO	2 (4), 1:05	Apr 2, 2010	Michael's Eighth Avenue, Glen Burnie, Maryland, U.S.	
2	Win	2–0	Kevin Johnson	TKO	3 (4), 2:45	Mar 20, 2010	Du Burns Arena, Baltimore, Maryland, U.S.	
1	Win	1–0	Francois Ambag	MD	4	Jan 31, 2010	Rosecroft Raceway, Fort Washington, Maryland, U.S.	

== Titles in boxing ==
- WBA-NABA USA cruiserweight title
