= Field house =

Indoor sports arenas and stadiums

Field house or fieldhouse is an American English term for an indoor sports arena or stadium, mostly used for college basketball, volleyball, or ice hockey, or a support building for various adjacent sports fields, e.g. locker room, team room, coaches' offices, etc. The term dates from the 1890s.

Notable field houses include:

== United States ==
=== Alaska ===
- Baker Field House, Eielson Air Force Base

=== Arkansas ===
- Rhodes Fieldhouse, Harding University

=== California ===
- Firestone Fieldhouse, Pepperdine University
- Field House, California State University Dominguez Hills

=== Colorado ===
- Balch Fieldhouse, University of Colorado
- Cadet Field House, United States Air Force Academy
- Cougar Field House, Colorado Christian University
- Steinhauer Field House, Colorado School of Mines

=== Connecticut ===
- Hugh S. Greer Field House, University of Connecticut

=== Delaware ===
- Chase Fieldhouse, Delaware Blue Coats
- Delaware Field House, University of Delaware

=== District of Columbia ===
- Yates Field House, Georgetown University

=== Florida ===
- Enyart-Alumni Field House, Rollins College

=== Georgia ===
- Hanner Fieldhouse, Georgia Southern University

=== Illinois ===
- Chick Evans Field House, Northern Illinois University
- Henry Crown Field House, University of Chicago
- Horton Fieldhouse, Illinois State University
- Robertson Memorial Field House, Bradley University
- Wharton Field House, Tri-Cities Blackhawks

=== Indiana ===
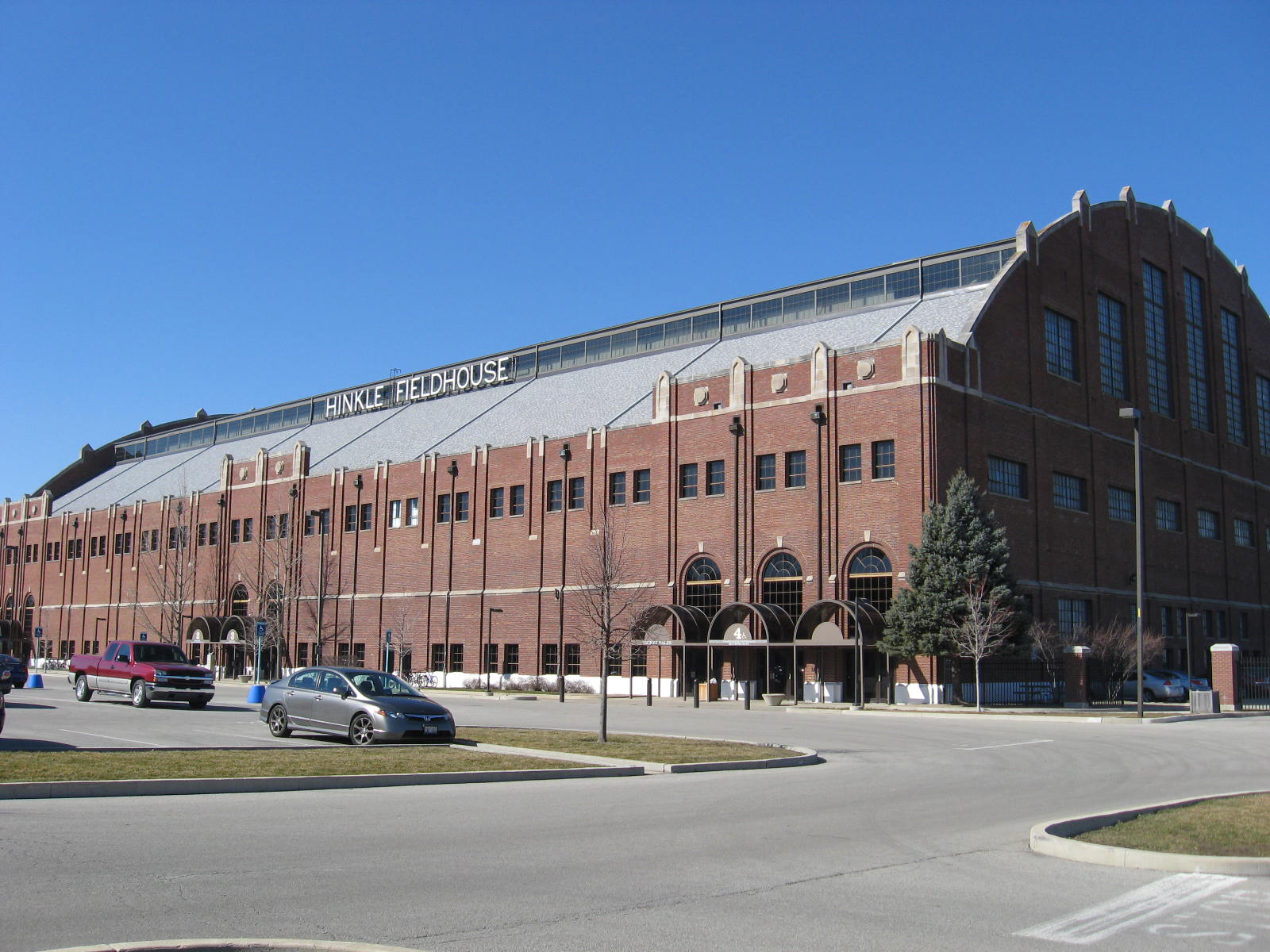
National Historic Landmark Hinkle Fieldhouse, located on the campus of Butler University.

- Bill Garrett Fieldhouse, Indiana University Bloomington
- Gainbridge Fieldhouse, Indiana Pacers and Indiana Fever
- Gladstein Fieldhouse, Indiana University Bloomington
- Hinkle Fieldhouse, Butler University
- Lambert Fieldhouse, Purdue University
- New Castle Fieldhouse, New Castle High School
- Notre Dame Fieldhouse, University of Notre Dame

=== Iowa ===
- Iowa Fieldhouse, University of Iowa

=== Kansas ===
- Ahearn Field House, Kansas State University
- Allen Fieldhouse, University of Kansas

=== Louisiana ===
- Devlin Fieldhouse, Tulane University
- Huey P. Long Field House, Louisiana State University
- Loyola Field House, New Orleans Jazz

=== Maryland ===
- Cole Field House, University of Maryland
- Halsey Field House, United States Naval Academy
- Hill Field House, Morgan State University
- Novak Field House, Prince George's Community College

=== Michigan ===
- Al Glick Field House. University of Michigan
- Bowen Field House, Eastern Michigan University
- Ford Fieldhouse, Grand Rapids Community College
- GVSU Fieldhouse, Grand Valley State University
- Hedgcock Fieldhouse, Northern Michigan University
- Jenison Fieldhouse, Michigan State University
- Oosterbaan Field House, University of Michigan

=== Minnesota ===
- John S. Glas Field House, Bemidji State University

=== Nebraska ===
- Sapp Fieldhouse, University of Nebraska at Omaha

=== New York ===
- Houston Field House, Rensselaer Polytechnic Institute
- Manley Field House, Syracuse University
- McCann Field House, Marist College

=== Ohio ===
- Armory Fieldhouse, University of Cincinnati
- The Field House, University of Toledo
- Finnegan Fieldhouse, Franciscan University of Steubenville
- Schmidt Field House, Xavier University

=== Oklahoma ===
- Frederickson Fieldhouse, Oklahoma City University
- Hamilton Field House, University of Central Oklahoma
- McCasland Field House, University of Oklahoma

=== Oregon ===
- Cone Fieldhouse, Willamette University
- McAlexander Fieldhouse, Oregon State University

=== Pennsylvania ===
- Alumni Memorial Fieldhouse, Saint Joseph's University
- Erie County Field House, American Hockey League
- Fitzgerald Field House, University of Pittsburgh
- Hamburg Field House, Hamburg
- Jake Nevin Field House, Villanova University

=== South Carolina ===
- Carolina Fieldhouse, University of South Carolina
- CSU Field House, Charleston Southern University
- Davis Field House, Bob Jones University
- McAlister Field House, The Citadel

=== Tennessee ===
- Elma Roane Fieldhouse, University of Memphis

=== Texas ===
- Texas A&M-Commerce Field House, Texas A&M University–Commerce
- Tudor Fieldhouse, Rice University
- UTRGV Fieldhouse, University of Texas Rio Grande Valley

=== Utah ===
- Smith Fieldhouse, Brigham Young University

=== Vermont ===
- Gutterson Fieldhouse, University of Vermont

=== Virginia ===
- Old Dominion University Fieldhouse, Old Dominion University

=== West Virginia ===
- Veterans Memorial Fieldhouse, Marshall University, Williamson Field House

=== Wisconsin ===
- University of Wisconsin Field House, University of Wisconsin–Madison

== Canada ==
=== Alberta ===
- Duvernay Fieldhouse, Okotoks Dawgs

=== Nova Scotia ===
- Dalplex Fieldhouse, Dalhousie University

=== Ontario ===
- Proctor Field House, Glendon College
- C.J. Sanders Field House, Lakehead University
