= Coal House =

Coal House may refer to:

- Coal House (TV series), a Welsh television series broadcast by the BBC
- Coal House (Williamson, West Virginia), a building built of coal masonry, in Williamson, WV
- Coal bin, a container or building for storing coal
