= Mountaineer Hotel =

- U.S. National Register of Historic Places
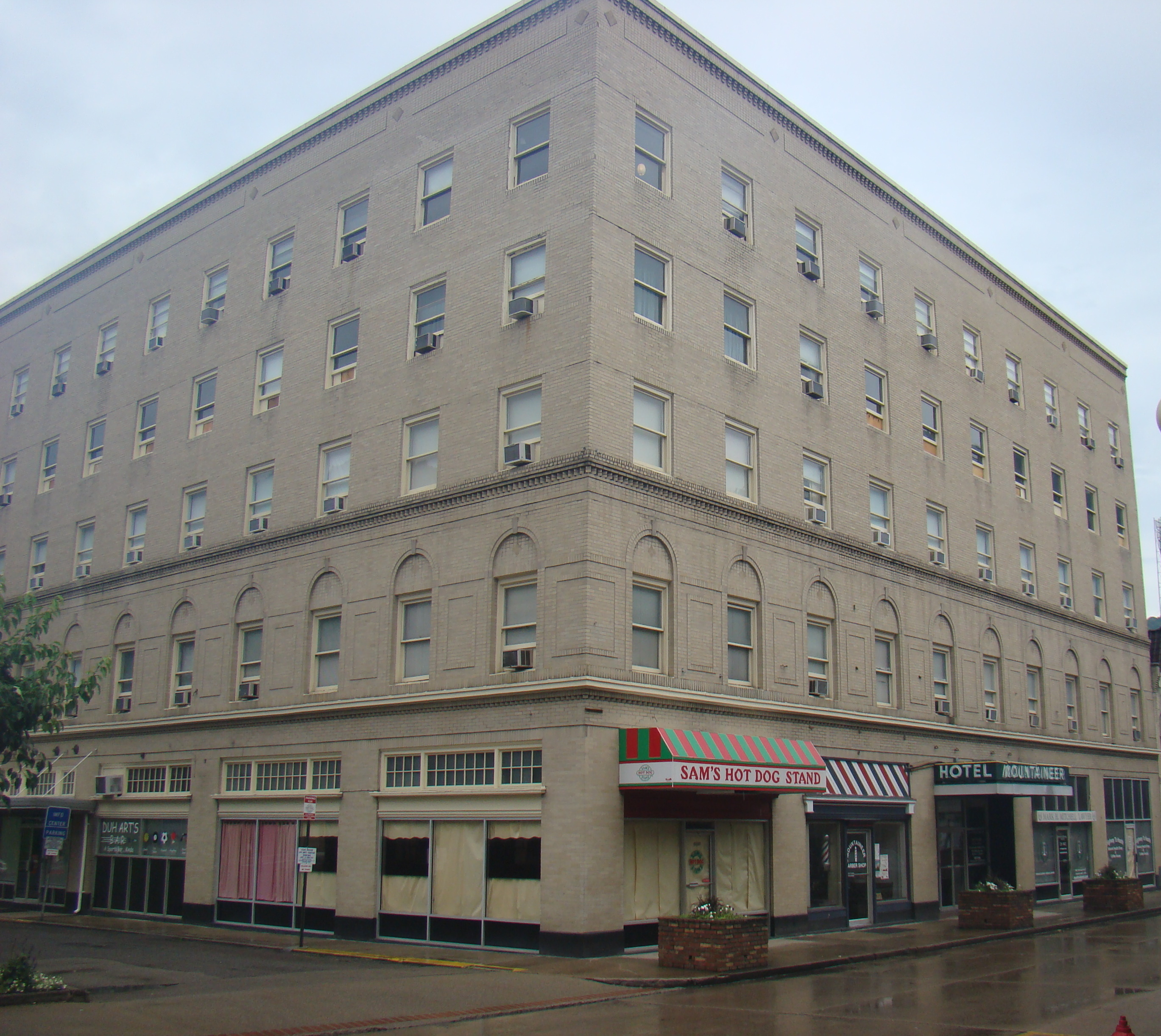
- Mountaineer Hotel; Williamson, West Virginia

- Location within West Virginia Location within the United States
- Location: Williamson, West Virginia
- Coordinates: 37°40′24″N 82°16′42″W
- Architect: Meanor & Handloser
- Architectural style: Classical Revival
- NRHP reference No.: 97000265
- Added to NRHP: March 21, 1997

The Mountaineer Hotel is an historic hotel located in Williamson, West Virginia, USA. Situated at the corner of East Second Avenue and Court Street with the main entrance located on East Second Avenue, the one hundred sixteen room hotel is in the center of the downtown commercial district.

The Classical Revival building was built in 1925 and added to the U.S. National Register of Historic Places on March 21, 1997.

== History ==
=== Construction ===
In 1923, in response to the rapid population and business growth in Williamson, the Williamson Chamber of Commerce sponsored an executive committee to raise funds for a new local hotel. Shares of stock for a new hotel were sold to 1,400 stockholders, who were mostly local residents, and $493,000 was raised. Four lots were purchased for $90,000 in the central commercial district and, in 1925, the community hotel was constructed. The Charleston, West Virginia, architectural firm of Meanor & Handloser designed the building, and the construction of the hotel was done by Payne Construction of Ashland, Kentucky, at a final cost of $600,000. In a naming contest held by the Chamber of Commerce, the name "Mountaineer Hotel" was chosen with a $100 prize going to the winner.

=== Events ===
The Mountaineer Hotel's location in the town center made it a key part of the Williamson's cultural history. Over the years, community events ranged from political rallies and civic club meetings to weddings and reunions.

When dignitaries such as President John F. Kennedy and First Lady Eleanor Roosevelt, entrepreneurs such as Henry Ford and celebrities such as Loretta Lynn and Hank Williams came to the area, they stayed at the Mountaineer Hotel.

== Architecture ==
=== Exterior ===
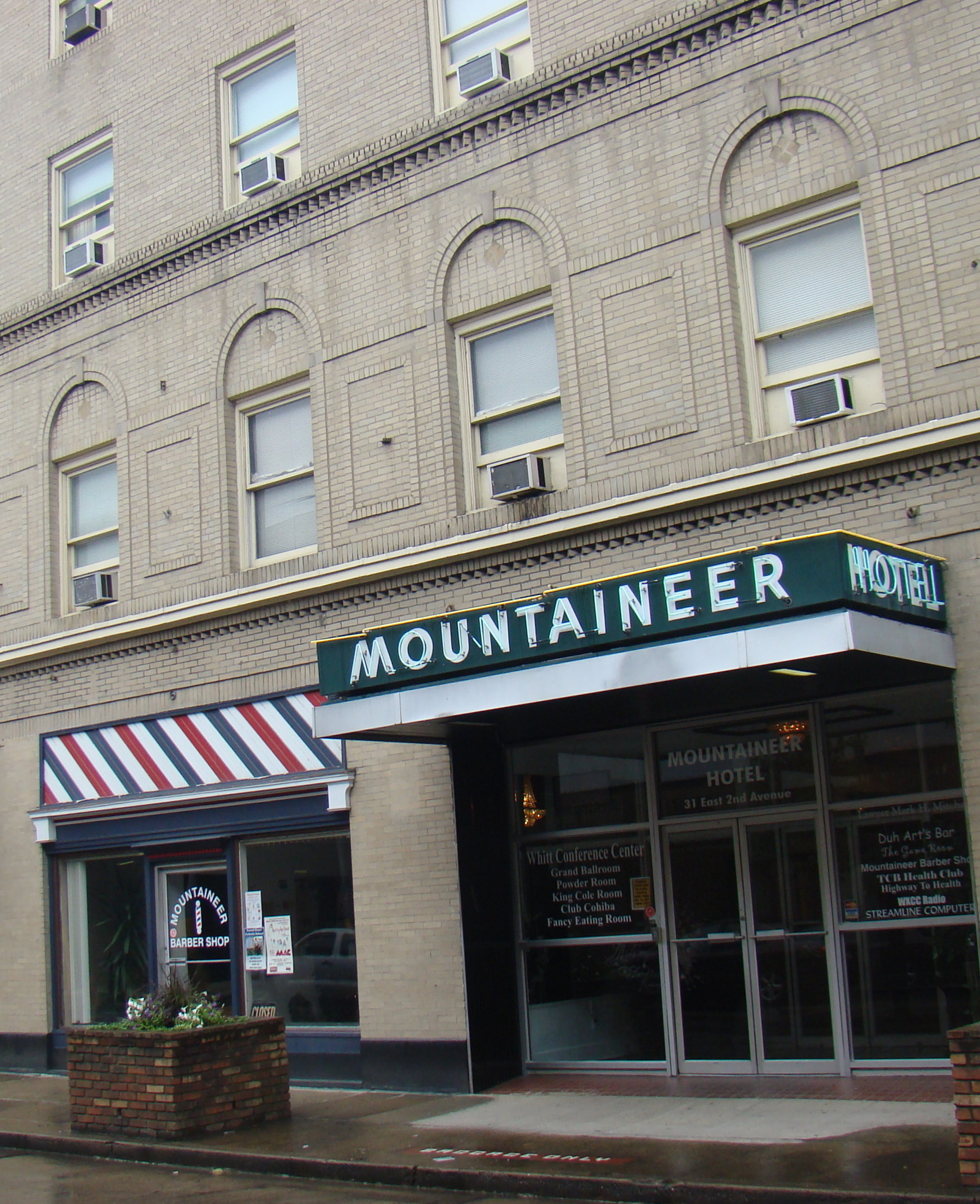
Mountaineer Hotel, Street view.

The square Classical Revival building is five stories tall. All around the building at the street level there are large bay openings where various retail shops are located. The exterior is framed with yellow glazed brick.

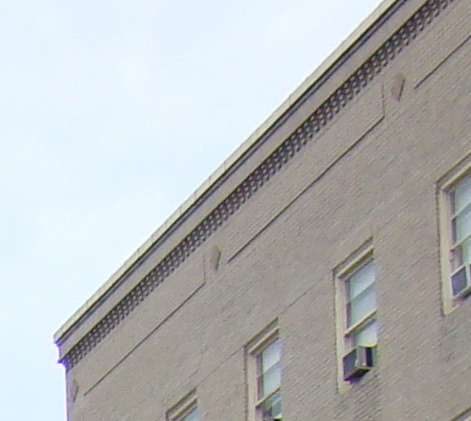
Mountaineer Hotel, roof line.

The street level and mezzanine stories are accentuated by a stringcourse at the cornice line, with the cornice line accentuated by angled bricks to give a dentil effect. Around the windows at the mezzanine level are false arch brick work in a keystone and centered diamond pattern.

The roof's cornice line has brick corbeling. Below the corbeling is a row of bricks extended slightly from the facade with bricks in a diamond design intermittently interrupting the row pattern.

=== Interior ===
The main entrance leads to a large lobby and the front desk with pigeonhole boxes for room keys and a teller window. French doors lead to the ballroom. The hotel has 116 rooms for guests, a formal ballroom, a lobby restaurant and sports bar.
