= World War Memorial (Kimball, West Virginia) =

- U.S. National Register of Historic Places
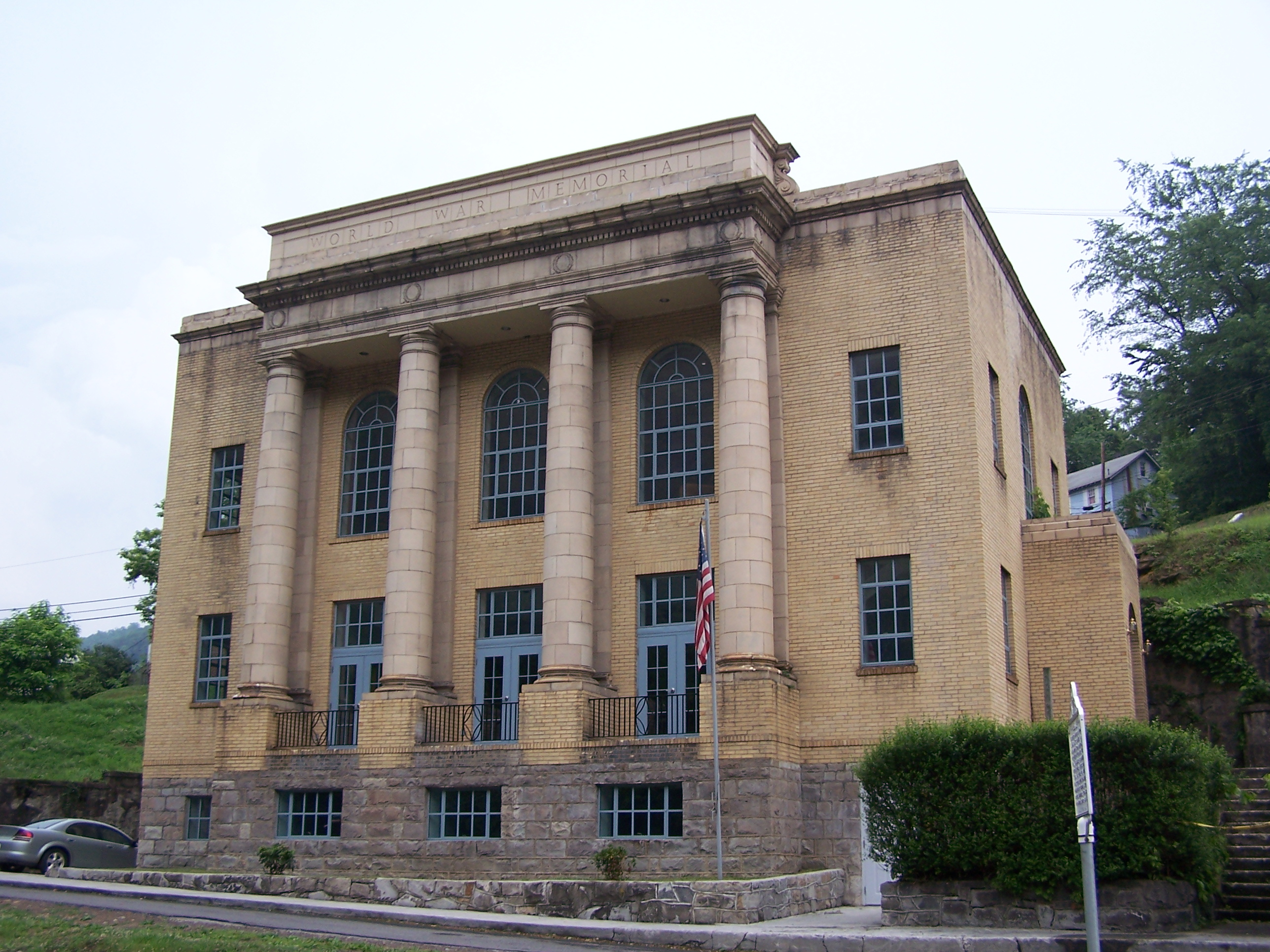

- Location within West Virginia Location within the United States
- Location: US 52, Kimball, West Virginia
- Coordinates: 37°25′31″N 81°30′24″W
- Built: 1928
- Built by: Boone, Eason & Woods
- Architect: Hassel T. Hicks
- Architectural style: Classical Revival
- NRHP reference No.: 93000227
- Added to NRHP: April 09, 1993

The World War Memorial in Kimball, West Virginia commemorates African Americans who served in World War I. The building sits on a hill in Kimball, a town in McDowell County, West Virginia. Constructed in 1928, the site was the first memorial of African-American veterans in the United States.

Many African Americans worked as coalminers in the late nineteenth and early twentieth century. As of 1920, McDowell County had the largest population of African Americans in the entire Appalachian region. 1,500 men from the county were among the 400,000 African Americans who volunteered for service during World War I.

== History ==
Initial funding for the site came after a memorial for white veterans was constructed in the McDowell County courthouse. African-American veterans petitioned the McDowell County Commission and were eventually granted $25,000 for the building's construction. An additional $19,500 was raised by the local American Legion post, bringing the total construction budget to $44,500.

In 1927, McDowell County hired local architect Hassel T. Hicks to design the memorial building, which was opened the following year. The dedication ceremony on February 11, 1928 included a speech from G.E. Ferguson, the only African American from West Virginia to serve as a captain in World War I. To each of the building's four columns, Ferguson gave a symbolic meaning: faith in America as a country, hope in ending injustice, charity toward others, and service to the greater community.

The completed memorial building included a hundred-seat meeting room, as well as a trophy room, kitchen, recreation center, and library, and was utilized by local citizens of all races. Functioning as a multipurpose community center, the building was frequently rented out for local social occasions. Most notably, the memorial hosted a performance by popular jazz musician Cab Calloway. It was also home to the first African-American Legion post. Known as Luther Patterson Post 36, the post was named after a black World War I veteran from West Virginia.

In the later decades of the twentieth century, the declining coal industry led to a decreased local population, and the memorial fell into disrepair. In 1991, a fire destroyed the interior of the building, leaving only the external structure intact.

The stone, terra cotta, and brick Classical Revival building stood as a ruin for more than a decade until a restoration. The memorial building was listed while still a ruin on the National Register of Historic Places in 1993.

== Present ==
After $1.6 million in repair efforts, the War Memorial reopened in 2006. The site was the recipient of a Congressional Black Caucus Veterans Braintrust Award in 2006 and an Honor Award from the West Virginia chapter of the American Institute of Architects in 2007. The monument was also recognized as a Conservation Solution by the National Trust for Historical Preservation.

The building now serves as a live cultural resource and is open to a wide variety of programs, including tours, training classes, conferences, planning forums, corporate dinners, and receptions, as well as social gatherings.

The memorial also houses an interactive museum experience titled "Forgotten Legacy: Soldiers of the Coalfields." Much of the exhibit was the work of a West Virginia University journalism professor. In 2010, he and a group of students began compiling an archive of interviews, photos, and artifacts from Affrilachian veterans. These and other historical narratives have been made available to the public.
