= Williamson Historic District =

Historic district in West Virginia, United States

- U.S. National Register of Historic Places
- U.S. Historic district
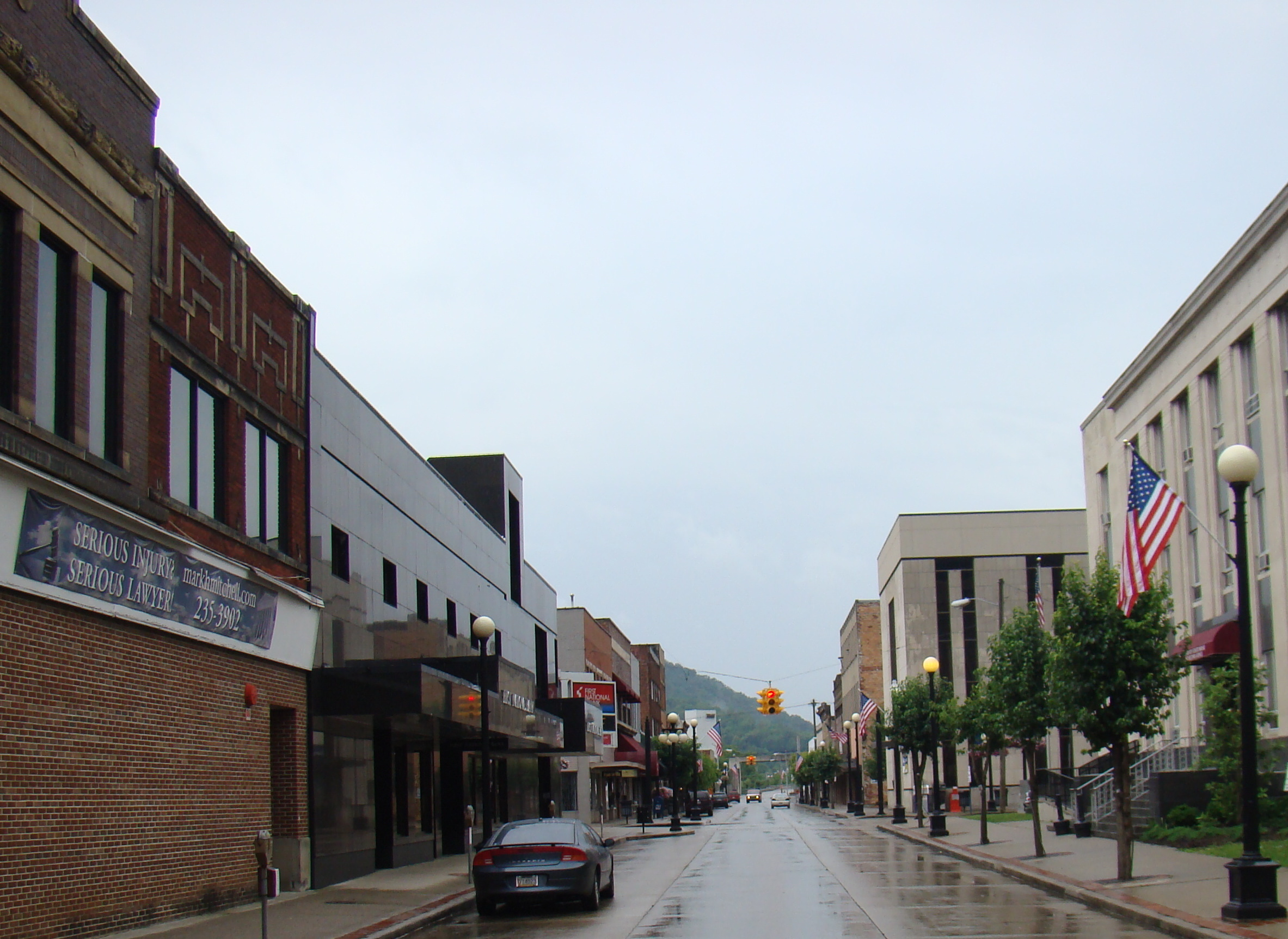
- Second Avenue downtown, at the Mingo County Courthouse

- Location within West Virginia Location within the United States
- Location: Williamson, West Virginia
- Coordinates: 37°40′31″N 82°16′30″W
- Built: 1892
- Architect: Pietro, Thoney
- Architectural style: Queen Anne, Late 19th and Early 20th Century American Movements
- NRHP reference No.: 06001045
- Added to NRHP: November 15, 2006

Williamson Historic District is a historic district in Williamson, West Virginia that roughly is bounded by the Norfolk and Western Railroad tracks, Pritchard, Poplar, Park, Mulberry and Elm Streets.
