= Algoma Coal and Coke Company Store =

- U.S. National Register of Historic Places
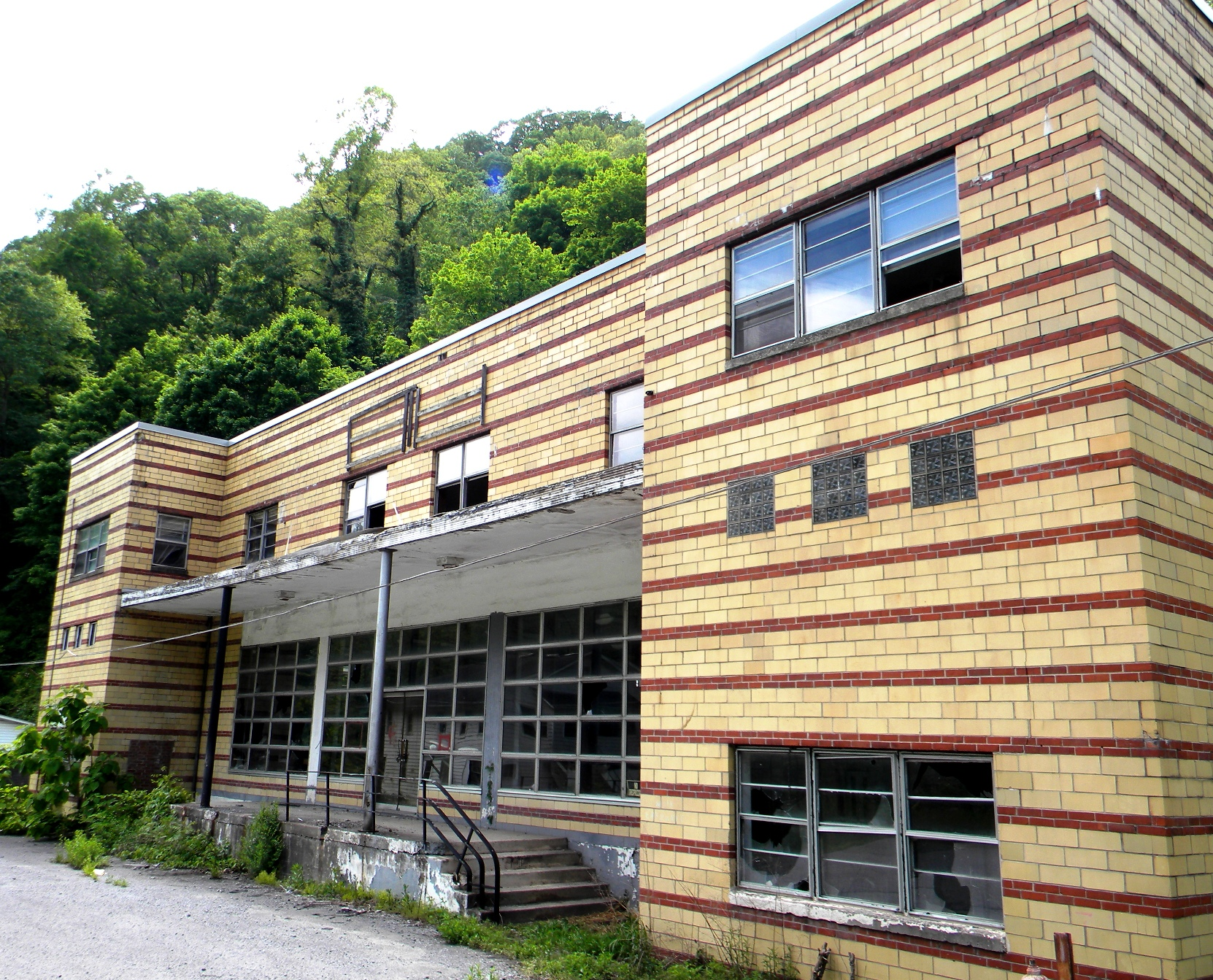
- Company store in May 2013

- Location within West Virginia Location within the United States
- Location: Co. Rt. 17, Algoma, West Virginia
- Coordinates: 37°25′10″N 81°25′35″W
- Area: less than one acre
- Built: 1948
- Architect: Hassel T. Hicks
- Architectural style: Moderne
- MPS: Coal Company Stores in McDowell County MPS
- NRHP reference No.: 92000323
- Added to NRHP: April 17, 1992

Algoma Coal and Coke Company Store, also known as Tug River Health Clinic, is a historic company store building located at Algoma, McDowell County, West Virginia. It was built in the 1948 to a design by Welch architect Hassel T. Hicks. It is a two-story building with a flat roof, with exterior walls of glazed yellow tile with alternating bands of red brick in the Moderne style. It originally housed a store and offices and has also been home to a health clinic.

It was listed on the National Register of Historic Places in 1992.
