= Ryad Merhy =

Belgian boxer (born 1992)

Personal information
- Nationality: Belgian
- Born: 28 November 1992 (age 33) Ouragahio, Ivory Coast
- Height: 181 cm (5 ft 11 in)
- Weight: Cruiserweight; Bridgerweight

Boxing career
- Stance: Orthodox

Boxing record
- Total fights: 39
- Wins: 36
- Win by KO: 29
- Losses: 3
- Draws: 0
- No contests: 0

Ryad Merhy (born 28 November 1992) is an Ivorian-born Belgian-French professional boxer. He has held the World Boxing Council (WBC) bridgerweight title since May 2026. Previously, he held the World Boxing Association (WBA) cruiserweight title (Regular version from 2021 to 2022. He also held the WBA Inter-Continental cruiserweight title in 2016 and the WBA interim cruiserweight title in 2019.

== Professional career ==
=== Early career ===
Born to an Ivorian-born father with Lebanese roots and an Ivorian mother, Merhy made his professional debut against Hrvoje Bozinovic on 29 June 2013. He won the fight by a second-round knockout. Merhy amassed a 17–0 record during the next two years, with 14 of those victories coming by way of stoppage, before he was fighting for his first professional title. Merhy faced Sylvera Louis for the vacant WBC Silver International cruiserweight title on 19 December 2015, at the RTL Spiroudome in Charleroi, Belgium. He won the fight by a sixth-round knockout.

==== WBA Inter-Continental champion ====
Merhy challenged Williams Ocando for the WBA Inter-Continental cruiserweight title on 21 May 2016. The twelve-round title bout was scheduled as the main event of an RTL broadcast card that took place at the RTL Spiroudome in Charleroi, Belgium. Merhy won the fight by a sixth-round technical knockout. He first staggered Ocando with a left hook, before unloading with a flurry of punches which forced referee Jan Christensen to wave the fight off.

After successfully clinching his second professional title, Merhy fought in two non-title bouts. Merhy faced Giorgi Tevdorashvili on 15 October 2016. He beat the over-matched Tevdorashvili by a sixth-round technical knockout. Two weeks later, on 1 November, Merhy beat Tamas Bajzath by a third-round technical knockout.

Merhy made his first WBA Inter-Continental title defense against Max Alexander on 17 December 2016. The fight was once again scheduled as the main event of an RTL broadcast card that took place at the RTL Spiroudome in Charleroi, Belgium. He won the fight by an eleventh-round knockout. Merhy made his second title defense against Mitch Williams on 20 May 2017, at the same venue and location as his previous two title fights. He won the fight by unanimous decision, with scores of 119–109, 119–109 and 118–110. Merhy made his third title defense against Nick Kisner on 16 December 2017, and was once again broadcast by RTL from the RTL Spiroudome. He won the fight by a fourth-round knockout.

Merhy faced the undefeated #1 ranked WBA cruiserweight contender Arsen Goulamirian for the vacant WBA interim cruiserweight title on 24 March 2018. The title fight was scheduled as the main event of a Canal+ broadcast card, and took place at the Palais des Sports in Marseille, France. Goulamirian won the fight by a technical knockout, stopping Merhy with a combination of unanswered strikes in the eleventh round, after dominating the fight from the very first round.

==== Pre-title fights ====
Merhy was scheduled to face Soso Abuladze on 29 June 2018. He successfully bounced back from his first professional loss with a sixth-round knockout victory. Merhy next faced Demetrius Banks on 20 October 2018. He won the fight by unanimous decision, with scores of 79–74, 80–73 and 80–73.

Merhy faced the 21–4 Samuel Clarkson for the vacant WBA International cruiserweight title on 15 December 2018. The bout was scheduled as the event headliner, and took place at the RTL Spiroudome in Charleroi, Belgium. He won the fight by a fourth-round knockout. Merhy next faced Cesar David Crenz on 4 May 2019. He won the fight by a third-round knockout.

=== WBA world cruiserweight champion ===
==== Merhy vs. Szellő ====
Merhy was scheduled to fight Imre Szellő for the vacant WBA interim cruiserweight title on 19 October 2019. The title bout took place at the RTL Spiroudome in Charleroi, just as almost all of his previous title bouts, excepting his fight with Goulamirian. Merhy captured the interim title with a seventh-round knockout of Szellő. The fight was stopped at the 2:10 minute mark of the round, after Merhy had knocked Szellő down twice in the seventh and once in the sixth round.

On January 19, 2021, the WBA withdrew its recognition of the incumbent WBA (Regular) cruiserweight champion Beibut Shumenov, following 30 months of inactivity from him. Accordingly, interim titleholder Ryad Merhy was then promoted to world status, while the current world champion Arsen Goulamirian was promoted to "Super" champion status. As such, Merhy became Belgium's first boxing champion.

==== Merhy vs. Zhang ====
After promoting him to world status, the WBA ordered Merhy to make his first title defense against former champion Yuniel Dorticos. However, as Dorticos failed to respond to an offer to fight in Belgium, the WBA allowed Merhy to make a voluntary title defense against the IBO cruiserweight champion Kevin Lerena. The bout was expected to take place on July 17, 2021, at the King Baudouin Stadium in Brussels, Belgium. Larena announced his withdrawal from the fight on June 24, due to a hand injury he had suffered in sparring. Lerena was replaced by the #14 ranked WBA cruiserweight contender Zhaoxin Zhang, who stepped in on a two-weeks notice. Merhy won the fight by an eight-round technical knockout. He dropped Zhang with a heavy left hook midway through the round, and although Zhang managed to get up, referee Oliver Brien deemed him unable to continue fighting.

==== Cancelled fight vs. Makabu ====
On February 3, 2022, it was announced that Merhy would make his second WBA world title defense against the 2016 Olympics gold medalist Evgeny Tishchenko. The bout was scheduled for March 26, and was expected to take place at the RCC Boxing Academy in Yekaterinburg, Russia. The fight was cancelled following the 2022 Russian invasion of Ukraine. Merhy was instead booked to face the WBC champion Ilunga Makabu in a title unification bout on September 30, 2022, at the Stade des Martyrs in Kinshasa, Congo. On July 19, 2022, Merhy was ordered by the WBA to face their "Super" cruiserweight champion Arsen Goulamirian in a title consolidation bout. He was given 24 hours to accept the fight, and 30 days to organize it should he accept. On August 8, Merhy revealed he might eschew both of those fights and move up to bridgerweight, as he felt he could no longer comfortably make the cruiserweight limit. Merhy refused to face Goulamirian in the letter of resignation sent to the WBA on August 12. This resulted in him being stripped of the Regular cruiserweight title.

==== Merhy vs. Anderson ====
On April 13, 2024, in Corpus Christi, Texas, Merhy was scheduled to face Jared Anderson. He lost the fight by unanimous decision.

== Professional boxing record ==
39 fights	36 wins	3 losses
By knockout	29	1
By decision	7	2

No.	Result	Record	Opponent	Type	Round, time	Date	Location	Notes
39	Win	36–3	Kevin Lerena	UD	12	30 May 2026	Hall des Expositions, Charleroi, Belgium	Won WBC bridgerweight title
38	Win	35–3	Gora Niang	KO	2 (10)	18 Oct 2025	Centre sportif du Blocry, Louvain La Neuve, Belgium	Won inaugural WBC Africa heavyweight
37	Win	34–3	Andrej Pesic	RTD	4 (12), 3:00	14 Jun 2025	Centre sportif du Blocry, Louvain La Nevus, Belgium	Won vacant WBC Silver bridgerweight title
36	Win	33–3	Halim Haxhijaj	RTD	1 (6), 3:00	5 Oct 2024	Dome Arena, Charleroi, Belgium	
35	Loss	32–3	Jared Anderson	UD	10	13 Apr 2024	American Bank Center, Corpus Christi, Texas, U.S.	For WBC–USNBC and WBO International heavyweight titles
34	Win	32–2	Tony Yoka	SD	10	09 Dec 2023	Stade Roland Garros, Paris, France	
33	Loss	31–2	Kevin Lerena	UD	12	13 May 2023	Emperors Palace, Kempton Park, South Africa	For inaugural WBC Silver bridgerweight title
32	Win	31–1	Dusan Krstin	TKO	3 (8)	22 Oct 2022	Spiroudome Arena, Charleroi, Belgium	
31	Win	30–1	Zhaoxin Zhang	TKO	9 (12), 0:20	17 Jul 2021	Stade Heysel, Brussels, Belgium	Retained WBA (Regular) cruiserweight title
30	Win	29–1	Imre Szellő	KO	7 (12), 2:10	19 Oct 2019	RTL Spiroudome, Charleroi, Belgium	Won vacant WBA interim cruiserweight title
29	Win	28–1	Cesar David Crenz	KO	3 (10), 0:22	4 May 2019	RTL Spiroudome, Charleroi, Belgium	
28	Win	27–1	Samuel Clarkson	KO	4 (12), 2:38	15 Dec 2018	RTL Spiroudome, Charleroi, Belgium	Won vacant WBA International cruiserweight title
27	Win	26–1	Demetrius Banks	UD	8	20 Oct 2018	Country Hall, Liège, Belgium	
26	Win	25–1	Soso Abuladze	KO	6 (8)	29 Jun 2018	Belleheide Center, Roosdaal, Belgium	
25	Loss	24–1	Arsen Goulamirian	TKO	11 (12), 0:51	24 Mar 2018	Palais des Sports, Marseille, France	For WBA interim cruiserweight title
24	Win	24–0	Nick Kisner	KO	4 (12), 2:30	16 Dec 2017	RTL Spiroudome, Charleroi, Belgium	Retained WBA Inter-Continental cruiserweight title
23	Win	23–0	Mitch Williams	UD	12	20 May 2017	RTL Spiroudome, Charleroi, Belgium	Retained WBA Inter-Continental cruiserweight title
22	Win	22–0	Max Alexander	KO	11 (12), 0:18	17 Dec 2016	RTL Spiroudome, Charleroi, Belgium	Retained WBA Inter-Continental cruiserweight title
21	Win	21–0	Tamas Bajzath	TKO	3 (8)	1 Nov 2016	Stedelijke Sporthalle, Izegem, Belgium	
20	Win	20–0	Giorgi Tevdorashvili	TKO	6 (8)	15 Oct 2016	Robert Charpentier Sports Complex, Paris, France	
19	Win	19–0	Williams Ocando	TKO	6 (12), 1:15	21 May 2016	RTL Spiroudome, Charleroi, Belgium	Won vacant WBA Inter-Continental cruiserweight title
18	Win	18–0	Sylvera Louis	KO	6 (12), 1:17	19 Dec 2015	RTL Spiroudome, Charleroi, Belgium	Won vacant WBC Silver International cruiserweight title
17	Win	17–0	Antonio Sousa	UD	8	26 Sep 2015	Hall Omnisports, Rebecq, Belgium	
16	Win	16–0	Attila Palko	TKO	2 (6)	31 May 2015	Zaal Forum, Aalst, Belgium	
15	Win	15–0	Arturs Kulikauskis	KO	7 (8), 2:55	4 Apr 2015	Rebecq, Belgium	
14	Win	14–0	Bjoern Blaschke	RTD	4 (6), 3:00	14 Mar 2015	RTL Spiroudome, Charleroi, Belgium	
13	Win	13–0	Shalva Jomardashvili	TKO	5 (8), 2:10	25 Dec 2014	Izegem, Belgium	
12	Win	12–0	Ben Nsafoah	KO	4 (8), 1:47	6 Dec 2014	RTL Spiroudome, Charleroi, Belgium	
11	Win	11–0	Ferenc Zsalek	UD	4	15 Nov 2014	Sporthal Bourgoyen, Ghent, Belgium	
10	Win	10–0	Cedric Kalonji	KO	3 (8), 0:45	3 Oct 2014	Topsporthal Vlaanderen, Ghent, Belgium	
9	Win	9–0	Abdelhadi Hanine	KO	1 (8)	31 May 2014	Ninove, Belgium	
8	Win	8–0	Paata Berikashvili	TKO	3 (6)	28 Mar 2014	Topsporthal Vlaanderen, Ghent, Belgium	
7	Win	7–0	Elvir Behlulovic	KO	2 (4), 2:41	9 Feb 2014	City of Brussels, Belgium	
6	Win	6–0	Patrick Berger	KO	2 (4), 2:08	11 Jan 2014	Country Hall, Liège, Belgium	
5	Win	5–0	Toni Visic	KO	3 (6)	14 Dec 2013	Belleheide Center, Roosdaal, Belgium	
4	Win	4–0	Jakub Wojcik	UD	4	23 Nov 2013	Parc des Sports, Charleroi, Belgium	
3	Win	3–0	Marko Martinjak	RTD	2 (4), 3:00	5 Oct 2013	Andenne Arena, Andenne, Belgium	
2	Win	2–0	Nikolai Ermenkov	KO	1 (6)	23 Aug 2013	Kursaal, Ostend, Belgium	
1	Win	1–0	Hrvoje Bozinovic	KO	2 (4), 0:48	29 Jun 2013	Ninove, Belgium	

== See also ==
- List of cruiserweight boxing champions
- List of bridgerweight boxing champions
- List of WBA world champions
- List of WBC world champions

Sporting positions
World boxing titles
Vacant Title last held by Arsen Goulamirian	WBA cruiserweight champion Interim title 19 October 2019 – 29 January 2021; Promoted	Title discontinued
Preceded by Beibut Shumenov; Stripped	WBA cruiserweight champion Regular title 29 January 2021 – 12 August 2022; Vacated	Title discontinued
