= Elven C. Smith House =

Historic house in West Virginia, United States

- U.S. National Register of Historic Places
- Location within West Virginia Location within the United States
- Location: 210 Little Oak St., Williamson, West Virginia
- Coordinates: 37°40′39″N 82°16′39″W
- Area: 2.3 acres (0.93 ha)
- Built: 1938
- Architect: Hassel T. Hicks
- Architectural style: Classical Revival
- NRHP reference No.: 02000899
- Added to NRHP: August 22, 2002

Elven C. Smith House is a historic home located at Williamson, Mingo County, West Virginia. It was built in 1938, in a Neo-Classical Revival / Georgian Revival style. It is a red brick building with a hipped roof and features a two-story, flat roofed portico supported by fluted columns. Also on the property is a stone retaining wall and monumental stairway in the landscaped gardens.

It was listed on the National Register of Historic Places in 2002.
