= Arsen Goulamirian =

French boxer (born 1987)

Arsen Goulamirian Արսեն Գուլամիրյան
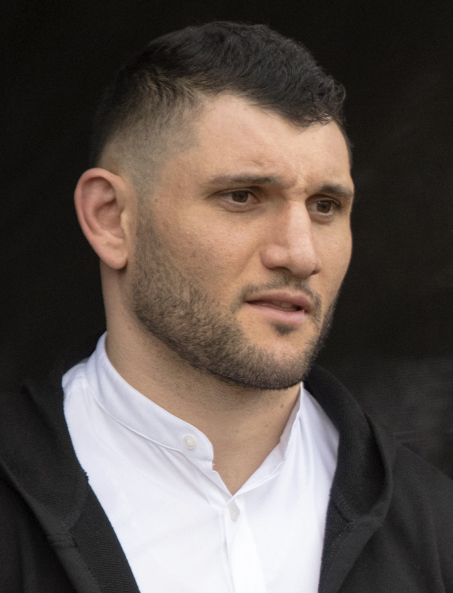
- Goulamirian at 2018 Top 14 Rugby Game

Personal information
- Nickname: Feroz
- Nationality: French
- Born: 4 October 1987 (age 39) Yerevan, Armenian SSR, USSR (nowadays Armenia)
- Height: 6 ft 1 in (185 cm)
- Weight: Cruiserweight

Boxing career
- Reach: 73 1/2 in (187 cm)
- Stance: Orthodox

Boxing record
- Total fights: 28
- Wins: 27
- Win by KO: 19
- Losses: 1

Arsen Goulamirian (Armenian: Արսեն Գուլամիրյան; born 4 October 1987) is an Armenian-born French professional boxer. He previously held the World Boxing Association (WBA) (Super version) cruiserweight title from 2019 to 2024, having previously held the (Regular) version in 2019.

== Professional career ==
=== Early career ===
Goulamirian turned professional in 2011 and won 14 consecutive fights before winning the WBA Continental (Europe) cruiserweight title. He would improve his record to 22–0 before getting a shot at the vacant Regular WBA cruiserweight title against Ryad Merhy. Goulamirian would end up winning the fight via 11th round stoppage and became the interim WBA cruiserweight champion.

=== WBA interim cruiserweight champion ===
==== Goulamirian vs. Merhy ====
Goulamirian was scheduled to face the undefeated WBA Inter-Continental cruiserweight titlist Ryad Merhy for the vacant WBA interim cruiserweight title. The bout was set as the main event of the 24 March 2018, Canal+ card held at the Palais des Sports in Marseille, France. Goulamirian was at the time the #1 ranked WBA cruiserweight contender, while Merhy was the #2 ranked contender in the WBA rankings. Goulamirian won the fight by a technical knockout, stopping Merhy with a combination of unanswered strikes in the eleventh round, after dominating the fight from the very first round.

The WBA changed Goulamirian's status from Regular to Interim, when former champion Beibut Shumenov came back from his eye injury and recovered the Regular WBA cruiserweight title by defeating Turkish Hizni Altunkaya on 7 July 2018.

==== Goulamirian vs. Flanagan ====
After capturing the interim WBA strap, Goulamirian was scheduled to face the one-time WBA cruiserweight super title challenger Mark Flanagan. The bout was once again scheduled as the main event of a Canal+ card, held on 20 October 2018, at the Palais des Sports in Marseille, France. Flanagan was ranked #10 by the WBA at cruiserweight. Goulamirian kept his undefeated record, winning the fight by a ninth-round technical knockout. The two fighters were on even footing for the first three rounds, but Flanagan began to tire from the fourth round onward, with a notable drop in his output. Flanagan was knocked down twice in the ninth round, with his corner deciding to throw in the towel after the second knockdown.

=== WBA cruiserweight champion ===
==== Promotion to Super champion ====
On 14 February 2019, it was revealed that Goulamirian would challenge the reigning WBA Regular champion Beibut Shumenov. As the two camps were unable to agree on the terms of the bout, Goulamirian's promoter Sébastien Acariès and Shumenov's promoter Don King both submitted bids for the fight. King won after submitting a winning bid of $821 000, for the proposed WBA "Regular" cruiserweight title fight. King tried to put the fight together on three separate dates and locations, on 13 April in Monaco, on 20 April in Kazakhstan and 13 May in New York, but all three attempts fell through. Shumenov later developed respiratory issues, which left him unable to fight for the foreseeable future. Accordingly, the WBA stripped Shumenov of his Regular title and promoted Goulamirian in his place.

On 8 June 2019, the WBA called for a 20 June purse bid to grant the promotional rights for a WBA Super title match between the reigning champion Denis Lebedev and regular champion Goulamirian. The minimum bid was $200 000, with a 75% split for Lebedev and 25% for Goulamirian. The purse bid was later suspended as both sides reached an agreement to finalize the fight. On 11 July 2019, Lebedev announced his retirement from the sport. On 20 July 2019, Goulamirian was elevated to the status of WBA Super Cruiserweight champion.

==== Goulamirian vs. Watts, Bejenaru ====
Goulamirian was scheduled to make the first defense of his WBA Super title against the reigning WBA Oceania cruiserweight champion Kane Watts. Watts was ranked #11 by the WBA at cruiserweight. The bout was scheduled as the co-main event to the Michel Soro and Cedric Vitu super welterweight clash, held on 15 November 2019, at the AccorHotels Arena in Paris, France. Goulamirian was the overwhelming betting favorite heading into the bout, with Ouest-France describing the fight as "a formality for Goulamirian". Goulamirian made quick work of his overmatched opponent, knocking him out with a left hook to the body at the 1:08 minute mark of the fourth round.

Goulamirian was scheduled to make his second WBA Super title defense against the undefeated Constantin Bejenaru in the main event of a Canal+ card held at the Palais des Sports in Marseille, France, on 28 December 2019. Bejenaru was ranked #8 by the WBA at cruiserweight. Goulamirian won the fight by a tenth-round stoppage. Referee Oliver Brien called in the ringside doctor after the ninth round, due to the amount of damage that Bejenaru suffered up to that point. After consulting with the physician, the referee decided to stop the fight. Goulamirian was leading on all three of the judges scorecards at that point, with scores of 87-83, 87-83, and 86-84.

==== Goulamirian vs. Egorov ====
On 12 February 2021, the WBA ordered Goulamirian to make a mandatory title defense against Aleksey Egorov. They were given a 30-day negotiation period, starting with 11 February 2021. As the two camps were unable to come to terms, the WBA ordered a purse bid to be held on 23 August, with a 65% split for Goulamirian as Super Champion, and 35% split for Egorov as holder of the Gold title. World of Boxing won with a $210 000 bid, which was the only one submitted. The fight was eventually scheduled for 10 December 2021, at the RCC Boxing Academy in Yekaterinburg, Russia. Goulamirian was later forced to withdraw from the bout, as he tested positive for COVID-19.

On 19 July 2022, Goulamirian was ordered by the WBA to face the "Regular" cruiserweight champion Ryad Merhy in a title unification bout, which would leave only a single recognized WBA world champion in the division. Both fighters were given 24 hours to advise the WBA if they would be to fight in 30 days. The winner of the fight would furthermore be ordered to make a mandatory defense against Alexey Egorov within 90 days of winning the title, but only if the Russo-Ukrainian War had concluded by then. Merhy delivered his letter of resignation to the WBA on 12 August, in which he stated that he would not be fighting Goulamirian, and was furthermore vacating his Regular cruiserweight title.

On 23 August 2022, the WBA once again ordered Goulamirian to make a mandatory title defense against the former "Gold" champion Aleksey Egorov, and assigned a 15-day negotiation period, before a purse bid would be called. A purse bid was called as they failed to reach an agreement, which was won by Y2 Boxing who bid $364,000. The bout took place at the La Palestre in Le Cannet, France, on 19 November 2022. Goulamirian won the fight by unanimous decision, with two scorecards of 116–112 and one scorecard of 117–111. WBA Regular world champion Ryad Merhy was stripped of his title on 12 August 2022, which left Goulamirian as the sole WBA titleholder at the weight.

==== Goulamirian vs. Ramirez ====
Goulamirian was expected to make his fourth WBA Cruiserweight title defense against Tommy McCarthy on 10 September 2023 in Marseille, France. On 22 July, it was revealed that event promoter Sebastien Acaries had sued the French mass media company Groupe Canal+, in order to force them broadcast and finance the championship bout. Acaries and Canal+ signed a contract in 2020, which obliged them to finance and show three title fights during the year, which was later made impossible by Goulamirian's injury and the onset of the COVID-19 pandemic. On 10 October 10, 2023, Goulamirian was ordered by the WBA to make a mandatory title defense against Yuniel Dorticos. On 13 January 2024, he was given permission by the WBA to make his next title defense against Gilberto Ramírez, instead of making a mandatory defense against Dorticos. The championship bout took place on March 30, 2024 at YouTube Theater in Los Angeles. Goulamirian lost the fight by unanimous decision. All three judges scored the fight 118–110 in favor of the challenger.

== Professional boxing record ==
28 fights	27 wins	1 loss
By knockout	19	0
By decision	8	1

No.	Result	Record	Opponent	Type	Round, time	Date	Location	Notes
28	Loss	27–1	Gilberto Ramírez	UD	12	30 Mar 2024	YouTube Theater, Inglewood, California, U.S.	Lost WBA (Super) cruiserweight title
27	Win	27–0	Alexey Egorov	UD	12	19 Nov 2022	La Palestre, Le Cannet, France	Retained WBA (Super) cruiserweight title
26	Win	26–0	Constantin Bejenaru	RTD	10 (12), 3:00	28 Dec 2019	Palais des Sports, Marseille, France	Retained WBA (Super) cruiserweight title
25	Win	25–0	Kane Watts	KO	4 (12), 1:05	15 Nov 2019	AccorHotels Arena, Paris, France	Retained WBA (Super) cruiserweight title
24	Win	24–0	Mark Flanagan	TKO	9 (12), 2:26	20 Oct 2018	Palais des Sports, Marseille, France	
23	Win	23–0	Ryad Merhy	TKO	11 (12), 0:51	24 Mar 2018	Palais des Sports, Marseille, France	Won WBA (Regular) cruiserweight title
22	Win	22–0	Hamilton Ventura	KO	3 (10), 2:58	2 Dec 2017	La Palestre, Le Cannet, France	
21	Win	21–0	Mitch Williams	TKO	9 (10), 2:04	1 Jul 2017	Casino d'Evian, Evian les Bains, France	
20	Win	20–0	Alexander Kubich	UD	10	22 Apr 2017	Astroballe, Villeurbanne, France	
19	Win	19–0	Arturs Kulikauskis	TKO	3 (10)	17 Dec 2016	Stade de l’Est, Saint-Denis, France	
18	Win	18–0	Giulian Ilie	TKO	2 (8)	22 Oct 2016	Casino de Deauville, Deauville, France	
17	Win	17–0	Andrei Kniazev	UD	12	20 May 2016	Palais des Sports Porte de Versailles, Paris, France	
16	Win	16–0	David Radeff	TKO	5 (10)	16 Apr 2016	Le PEPSI, Issoudun, France	Won France cruiserweight title
15	Win	15–0	Lubos Suda	TKO	1 (12)	5 Mar 2016	Palais des sports, Paris, France	
14	Win	14–0	Tomislav Rudan	KO	2 (6)	29 Jan 2016	Salle Polyvalente des Ramiers, Blagnac, France	
13	Win	13–0	Isossa Mondo	TKO	6 (8)	17 Dec 2015	Cirque d'hiver, Paris, France	
12	Win	12–0	Lukasz Rusiewicz	UD	8	17 Oct 2015	Salle Polyvalente de Mon Idee, Auvillers-les-Forges, France	
11	Win	11–0	Mohamed Azzaoui	TKO	1 (8)	3 Jul 2015	Salle du Mouzon, Auch, France	
10	Win	10–0	Toni Visic	TKO	3 (6)	31 May 2015	Zaal Forum, Aalst, Belgium	
9	Win	9–0	Ismail Abdoul	SD	8	3 Apr 2015	Topsporthal Vlaanderen, Ghent, Belgium	
8	Win	8–0	Arturs Kulikauskis	PTS	6	30 Jan 2015	Salle Polyvalente des Ramiers, Blagnac, France	
7	Win	7–0	Martin Avila	KO	1 (6), 0:50	21 Mar 2014	Holiday Inn, Greater Montreal, Canada	
6	Win	6–0	Mathieu Monnier	UD	6	19 Sep 2013	Casino le Lyon Vert, Lyon, France	
5	Win	5–0	David Radeff	TKO	7 (10)	5 Jul 2013	Salle du Mouzon, Auch, France	
4	Win	4–0	Taylor Mabika	UD	8	30 Mar 2013	Salle Jean Mace, Issoudun, France	
3	Win	3–0	Patryk Kowoll	TKO	1 (6)	23 Nov 2012	Salle Polyvalente des Ramiers, Blagnac, France	
2	Win	2–0	Antoine Boya	PTS	6	26 Jan 2012	Salle Polyvalente des Ramiers, Blagnac, France	
1	Win	1–0	Adrian Bleszynski	TKO	1 (4)	27 May 2011	Salle Polyvalente des Ramiers, Blagnac, France	

== See also ==
- List of world cruiserweight boxing champions

Sporting positions
Regional boxing titles
Preceded by David Redaff	French cruiserweight champion 16 April 2016 – April 2017	Vacant Title next held by Siril Makiadi
Vacant	WBA Gold cruiserweight champion 20 October 2018 – 31 May 2019	Followed by Paul Bamba
World boxing titles
Vacant Title last held by Yuniel Dorticos	WBA cruiserweight champion Interim title 24 March 2018 – 20 October 2018; Won WBA Gold title	Vacant Title next held by Ryad Merhy
Vacant Title last held by Beibut Shumenov; Status changed	WBA cruiserweight champion 31 May 2019 – 1 September 2019; Promoted	Succeeded by Himself as Super champion
Vacant Title last held by Oleksandr Usyk	WBA cruiserweight champion Super title 1 September 2019 – 30 March 2024	Succeeded by Gilberto Ramírez
