= Williamson Field House =

- "The Field House"
- Interactive map of Williamson Field House
- Address: 1703 W. Third Avenue
- Location: Williamson, West Virginia
- Owner: Williamson Parks and Recreation Board
- Seating type: Wooden Bleachers
- Capacity: 6,000 (Boxing/Concert); 5,000 (Basketball with Metal Floor Bleachers Installed)
- Type: Indoor Arena, Field House

Construction
- Groundbreaking: February 1950
- Built: February 1950 – November 1951
- Opened: 1951
- Renovated: 2024
- Expanded: 1960 (Locker Rooms)

- Williamson Field House
- U.S. National Register of Historic Places
- Location within West Virginia Location within the United States
- Location: 1703 W. Third Ave., Williamson, West Virginia
- Coordinates: 37°40′40″N 82°17′32″W
- Built: 1950–51
- Architect: Stettler, Lewis
- Architectural style: Modern
- NRHP reference No.: 11000930
- Added to NRHP: December 15, 2011

The Williamson Field House is a historic field house located in Williamson Memorial Park in Williamson, West Virginia. The field house was built in 1950–51 to serve as a recreational center and auditorium for Williamson residents. Architect Lewis Stettler designed the Modernist building, which features a hipped dome roof, banded concrete, brick quoins and pilasters, glass block windows, and wooden decorations. The field house has 6,000 seats and is the largest venue in the surrounding area. Events held at the venue have included a visit from Oprah Winfrey, Harlem Globetrotters games, light heavyweight world title fight (International Boxing Federation) and local sporting events and shows. The field house was added to the National Register of Historic Places on December 15, 2011.

== History ==
In 1946, the City of Williamson purchased the five-acre property where the field house is situated from a local baker for $11,500. The park was to be a World War II veteran's memorial in the form of a recreational center, to serve Williamson City and Mingo County Citizens.

In 1950, Mayor Joe P. Hatfield and city council members helped plan the details of the facility, including the original idea for a removable wooden sectional floor for basketball, which could be stored under the stands. However, this concept was abandoned due to cost. Mayor Hatfield, as well as the committee, established that the building would be cinder block and painted white or gray and would consist of two floors. Hoping for construction to start in early spring, they awarded the contract for the concrete foundation work on January 3, 1950 to a local general construction firm, C.H. Jimison & Sons, Inc.

Huntington architect, Lewis Stettler, designed the memorial field house a described it to the local news at the time as an "unusual field house". Stettler studied architecture at the Chicago Art Institute, where he concentrated on modern style and form. He designed numerous schools and specialized in sports arenas in West Virginia. Another work of his, which was contemporary to the Williamson Field House, was the Huntington Veterans Memorial Field House (demolished in 2012).

Construction bids were received in February 1950. In order to award the contracts, the city of Williamson had to raise the money. The city raised $300,000 in revenue bonds to be paid from tax yields. The project would not cost the city tax payers any more money. It was estimated the new field house would cost approximately sixty dollars per guest, with a 5,000 seat configuration.

On February 25, 1950 the construction and detail contracts were awarded to C.H. Jimison & Sons, Inc. for general construction; Huntington Heating & Supply Company for design and installation of a heating and cooling system; Rosenblat and Kirstein, Inc. for the electrical work; and Whitehurst and Company for the plumbing. The original opening date was set for fall of the same year; however, the coal strike created a steel shortage. Construction on the field house was halted from February to mid-August 1950. Though the building was not complete until 1951, the dedication plaque installed on the front side of the building was inscribed with "1950". The first ever event held in the newly finished facility was a rival high school basketball game between Williamson and Wayne High Schools, held on December 15, 1951. A news article in the Williamson Daily News stated that a formal gala for the opening would be held after the New Year. However, it is unclear if such an event ever occurred.

Over the years the venue hosted various events including local high school basketball games, graduations, the Harlem Globetrotters Show, and various concerts. During the period of significance local dances, basketball games, wrestling matches, boxing tournaments, circuses, car shows, and celebrity athletes drew an average of 1,500 spectators to the field house. It was also used as a FEMA emergency distribution center in 1953. Additionally, the local National Guard units use the field house any time Williamson is declared in a state of emergency. In one year, on average, 30,000 spectators attended events at the Williamson Field House. The city of Williamson prides itself on the fact that the Field House is one of the largest in the area as the closest in size and location was demolished in 2012 (Veterans Memorial Field House in Huntington, WV).

== Integrity ==
Devastating floods in 1977 and 1984 destroyed the basketball court floors, wood seats, and some wooden bleachers. However, sympathetic and similar replacements were installed. In 1986, the original 275 wooden theater-style seats were replaced with 115 actual theater seats from nearby Williamson High School Theater. When the flood waters reached the second row of bleachers on the second story, similar wood plants replaced the original 1959, sodden timbers. No seating was lost with the replacements. Also, all doors were replaced in the early 1980s for improved security. In 1981, the dome ceiling was lowered with a tiled drop ceiling to enhance the sound quality and improve the efficiency of the heating system. On the exterior, the original asphalt shingles were replaced in 2000 with a rubberized plastic, polyurethane coating.

== 2015 renovations ==
In the Fall of 2015, the Williamson Board of Parks and Recreation made a motion to have the roof re-coated and outside of the building painted. This project lasted nearly a month and gave the structure a much cleaner appearance. Additionally, earlier in 2015, the interior was repainted and thoroughly cleaned. The Williamson High School Athletic Hall of Fame was also added along the south hallway downstairs and features many pictures and memorabilia of past State Championship teams the school had. Adjacent to the hallway is the Hall of Fame Room that features several jerseys and items from WHS and can be used as a meeting space. Future plans include to upgrade the restrooms in the building. None of the renovations altered the original appearance or design to the building.
