= Algoma, West Virginia =

Unincorporated community in West Virginia, United States

Algoma
- Unincorporated community
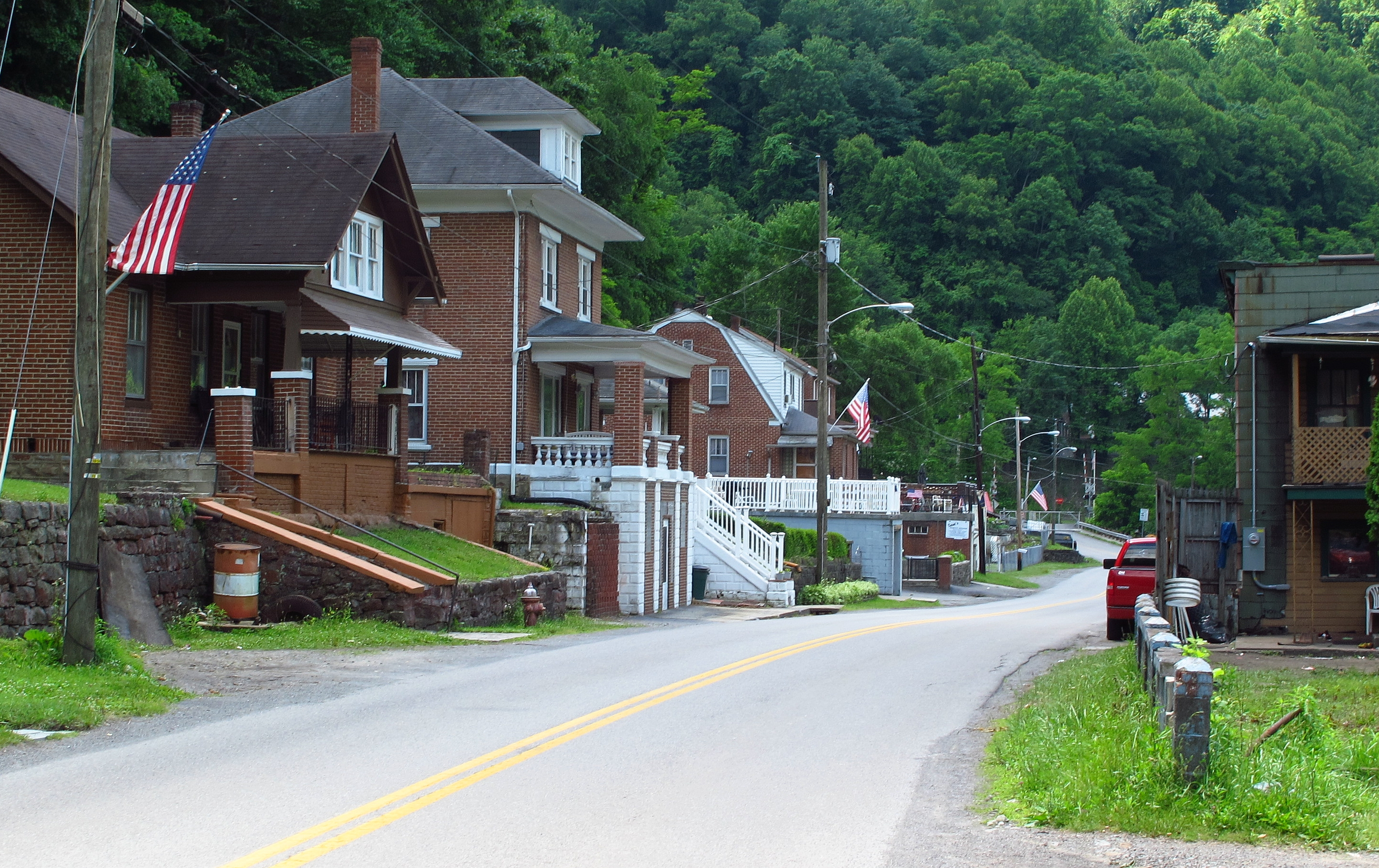
- Cherokee Road in Algoma

- Location within the state of West Virginia Algoma (the United States)
- Coordinates: 37°25′8″N 81°25′33″W
- Country: United States
- State: West Virginia
- County: McDowell
- Time zone: UTC-5 (Eastern (EST))
  - Summer (DST): UTC-4 (EDT)
- ZIP codes: 24807
- GNIS feature ID: 1534873

Algoma is an unincorporated community in McDowell County, West Virginia, United States. Algoma is located adjacent to the town of Northfork. Its post office was established in 1891 and discontinued in 1988. Algoma was most likely derived from the Algonquin language.

The Algoma Coal and Coke Company Store was listed on the National Register of Historic Places in 1992.
