= Ford Fieldhouse =

Coordinates: 42.967713°N 85.665824°W

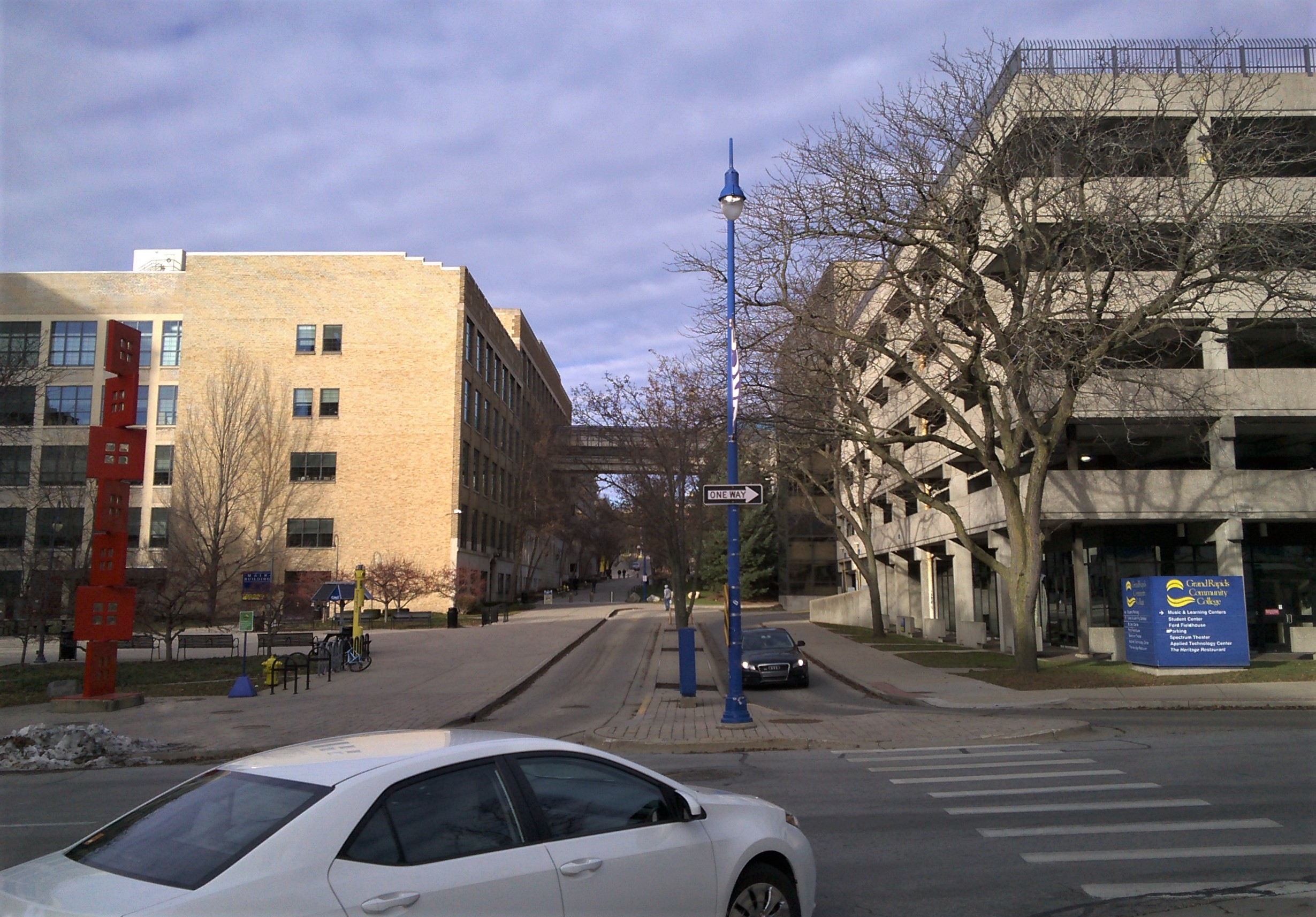
Grand Rapids Community College.jpg

The Gerald R. Ford Fieldhouse is multi-purpose arena in Grand Rapids, Michigan, USA, on the campus of Grand Rapids Community College. The original dedication of the facility was held in 1976 and attended by President Gerald Ford and first lady Betty Ford. In 2019, the fieldhouse received an $8M renovation to address half of the building's needs. In 2025, the fieldhouse received a $15 million renovation to address the other half of the facility needs. The fieldhouse houses a gymnasium that seats 4,000, classrooms, study lounges, locker rooms, the recreation center, and an outdoor turf field.
