= Coal House (Williamson, West Virginia) =

- U.S. National Register of Historic Places
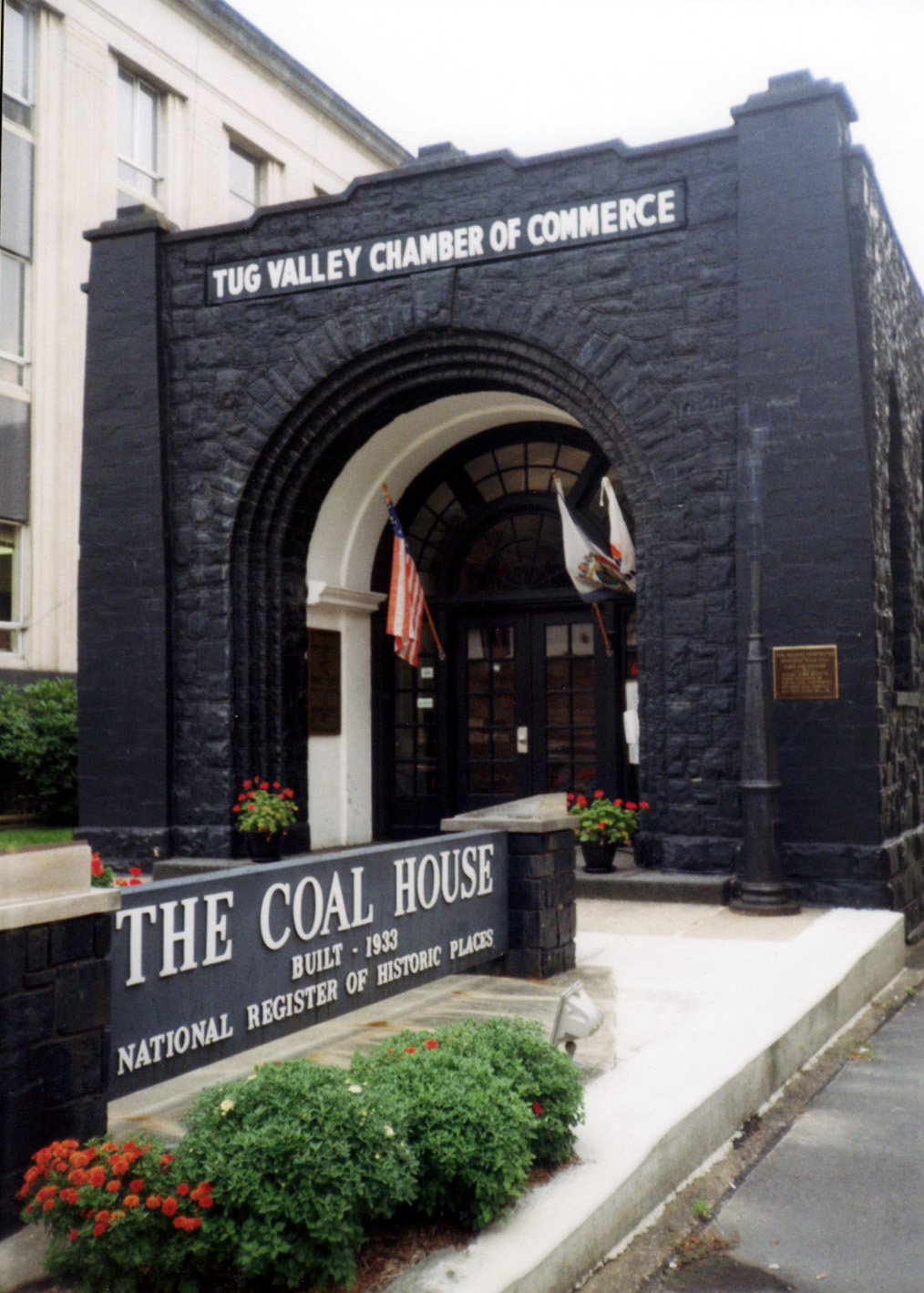

- Location within West Virginia Location within the United States
- Location: 2nd Ave. and Court St., Williamson, West Virginia
- Coordinates: 37°40′19″N 82°16′40″W
- Built: 1933
- Built by: David M. Goode
- Architect: Hassel T. Hicks
- NRHP reference No.: 80004297
- Added to NRHP: March 6, 1980

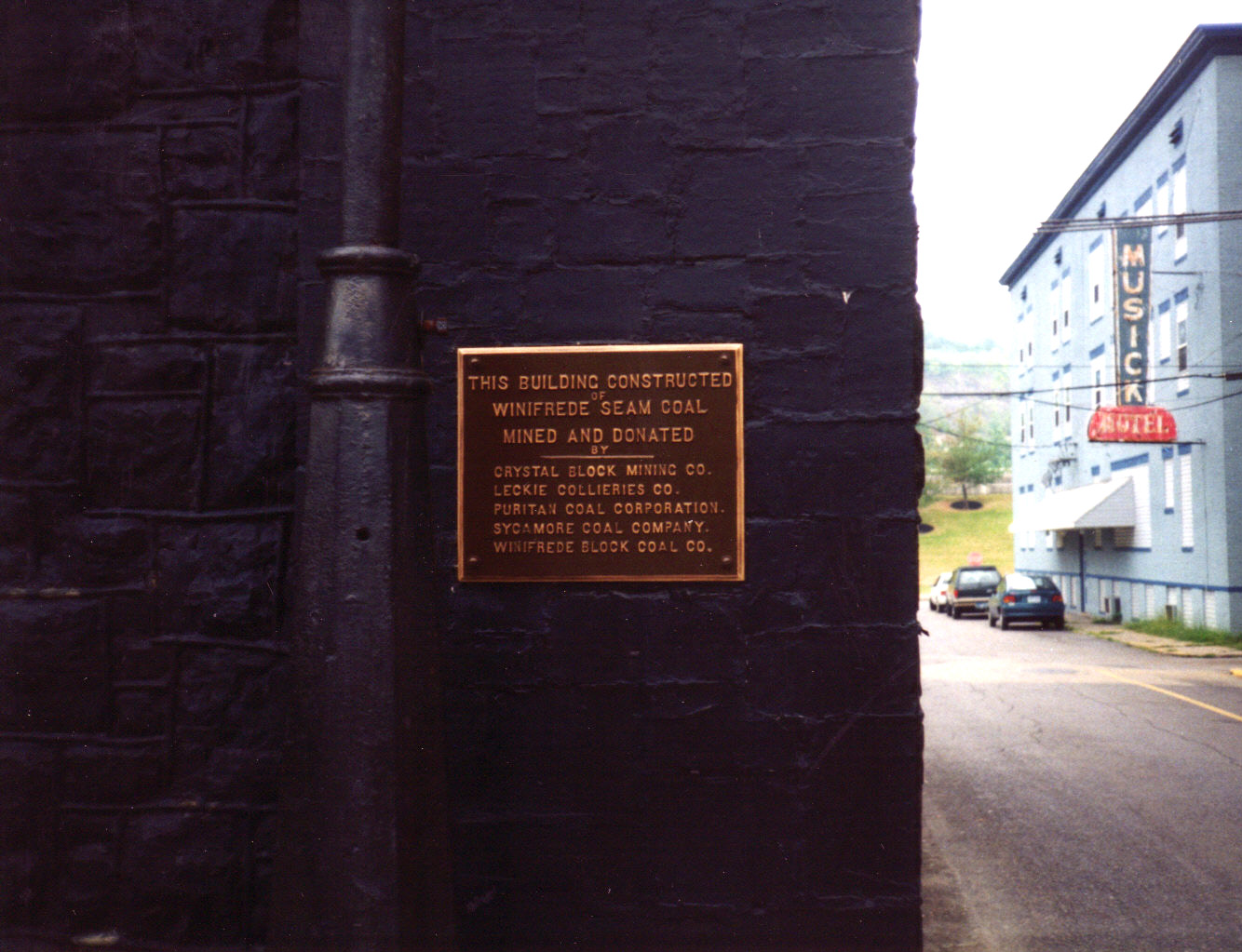
Plaque on the Coal House

The Coal House in Williamson, West Virginia is a unique building built of coal masonry. The bituminous coal was quarried as blocks and dressed as stone using 65 tons of coal from the nearby Winifrede Seam. At the time of its construction it was the only coal building in West Virginia. The house was designed by architect Hassel T. Hicks of Welch, West Virginia and supervised by David M. Goode. The coal masonry was varnished for weather-resistance. Located adjacent to the Mingo County Courthouse, it houses the Tug Valley Chamber of Commerce.

The building's construction in 1933 was organized as a publicity stunt by O. W. Evans of the Norfolk and Western Railway, who wished to create a symbol of the "Billion Dollar Coalfield" centered on Williamson. While it is known as the "Coal House", it has never been a residence.

West Virginia's second coal house was built in 1959 in Lewisburg, West Virginia.

On October 11, 2010, the Coal House caught fire. There was extensive damage to the inside of the building and minimal damage to the outside structure. Following $200,000 of restoration work the Coal House was reopened in September 2011.
