= Williamson, West Virginia =

- City
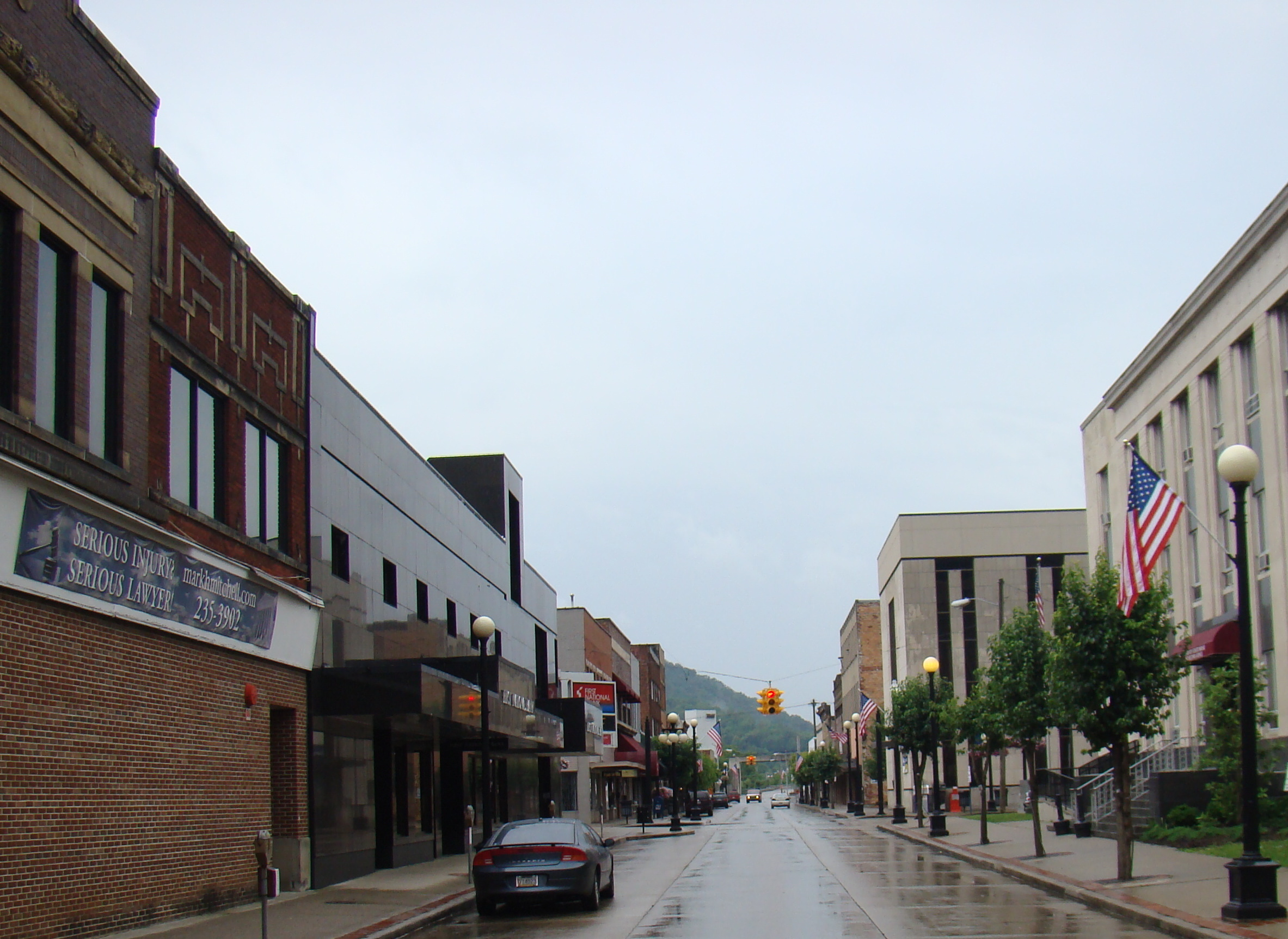
- Williamson, West Virginia; view looking down East 2nd Ave.
- Interactive map of Williamson, West Virginia
- Location within West Virginia Location within the United States
- Coordinates: 37°40′26″N 82°16′47″W
- Country: United States
- State: West Virginia
- County: Mingo
- Incorporated: 1905

Government
  - Mayor: Mike Casey

Area
  - Total: 3.27 sq mi (8.48 km^{2})
  - Land: 3.27 sq mi (8.48 km^{2})
  - Water: 0 sq mi (0.00 km^{2})
- Elevation: 653 ft (199 m)

Population (2020)
  - Total: 3,083
  - Density: 817.2/sq mi (315.52/km^{2})
- Time zone: UTC-5 (Eastern (EST))
  - Summer (DST): UTC-4 (EDT)
- ZIP code: 25661
- Area code: 304
- FIPS code: 54-87508
- GNIS feature ID: 1549185

Williamson is a city in and the county seat of Mingo County, West Virginia, United States, along the Tug Fork River. The population was 3,042 at the 2020 census. It is the county's largest and most populous city. Williamson is home to Southern West Virginia Community and Technical College. The Tug Fork River separates Williamson from South Williamson, Kentucky.

Williamson is the site of a large rail yard built by the former Norfolk and Western Railroad (now Norfolk Southern Railway), which was built to service the many coal mines of the region. The city is protected by a floodwall, completed by the U.S. Army Corps of Engineers in 1991 in response to devastating floods along the Tug Fork River in 1977 and again in 1984. The wall incorporates floodgates along major access points which, when locked, form a solid barrier against floodwaters. There have only been three uses of the gates thus far: the first occurring in 2002 during a major flood in the region, the second occurring in 2003, when only two lower lying gates were closed in anticipation of rising water levels, and in 2025 when another major flood struck the region, causing all the gates to be closed for the first time ever in the floodwall's almost 35 year history due to the Tug Fork rising to levels not seen since 1984.

The local economy is largely fueled by coal mining, transportation, health care and retail businesses.

== History ==
Williamson was incorporated in 1905. Most historians believe that Williamson was named in honor of Wallace J. Williamson. He owned the land where Williamson now stands, earned a fortune in real estate investments in the area, and founded the city's first bank and its first hotel. Others claim that the city was named for Wallace's father, Benjamin F. Williamson. He owned most of the land in the region before dividing it among his sons.

Williamson grew rapidly once the railroad connected into the town. Its population, just 688 in 1900, jumped to 6,819 in 1920 and 9,410 in 1930.

== Geography ==
According to the United States Census Bureau, the city has a total area of 3.26 square miles (8.44 km^{2}), all land.

=== Climate ===
The climate in this area is characterized by hot, humid summers and generally mild to cool winters. According to the Köppen Climate Classification system, Williamson has a humid subtropical climate, abbreviated "Cfa" on climate maps.

Climate data for Williamson, West Virginia (1991–2020 normals, extremes 1993–present)
Month	Jan	Feb	Mar	Apr	May	Jun	Jul	Aug	Sep	Oct	Nov	Dec	Year
Record high °F (°C)	80 (27)	85 (29)	90 (32)	95 (35)	98 (37)	104 (40)	104 (40)	103 (39)	99 (37)	93 (34)	88 (31)	80 (27)	104 (40)
Mean daily maximum °F (°C)	46.5 (8.1)	50.7 (10.4)	59.7 (15.4)	71.7 (22.1)	78.6 (25.9)	85.3 (29.6)	88.6 (31.4)	87.6 (30.9)	82.2 (27.9)	71.5 (21.9)	61.0 (16.1)	50.2 (10.1)	69.5 (20.8)
Daily mean °F (°C)	36.1 (2.3)	39.8 (4.3)	47.1 (8.4)	57.6 (14.2)	66.3 (19.1)	73.9 (23.3)	77.5 (25.3)	76.6 (24.8)	70.6 (21.4)	59.1 (15.1)	47.9 (8.8)	40.2 (4.6)	57.7 (14.3)
Mean daily minimum °F (°C)	25.8 (−3.4)	29.0 (−1.7)	34.5 (1.4)	43.5 (6.4)	53.9 (12.2)	62.5 (16.9)	66.5 (19.2)	65.6 (18.7)	59.0 (15.0)	46.6 (8.1)	34.9 (1.6)	30.1 (−1.1)	46.0 (7.8)
Record low °F (°C)	−16 (−27)	−13 (−25)	6 (−14)	25 (−4)	34 (1)	44 (7)	45 (7)	40 (4)	40 (4)	27 (−3)	14 (−10)	1 (−17)	−16 (−27)
Average precipitation inches (mm)	3.37 (86)	3.37 (86)	4.68 (119)	4.02 (102)	4.34 (110)	5.38 (137)	5.84 (148)	3.90 (99)	3.13 (80)	3.16 (80)	2.99 (76)	4.12 (105)	48.30 (1,227)
Average snowfall inches (cm)	4.4 (11)	3.0 (7.6)	3.1 (7.9)	0.1 (0.25)	0.0 (0.0)	0.0 (0.0)	0.0 (0.0)	0.0 (0.0)	0.0 (0.0)	0.0 (0.0)	0.1 (0.25)	2.4 (6.1)	13.1 (33)
Average precipitation days (≥ 0.01 in)	12.7	11.1	13.2	12.0	13.4	12.6	12.1	9.6	8.8	9.6	10.6	12.2	137.9
Average snowy days (≥ 0.1 in)	2.4	2.3	1.3	0.1	0.0	0.0	0.0	0.0	0.0	0.0	0.1	1.1	7.3
Source: NOAA

== Demographics ==
Historical population
Census	Pop.	Note	%±
1900	688		—
1910	3,561		417.6%
1920	6,819		91.5%
1930	9,410		38.0%
1940	8,366		−11.1%
1950	8,624		3.1%
1960	6,746		−21.8%
1970	5,831		−13.6%
1980	5,219		−10.5%
1990	4,154		−20.4%
2000	3,414		−17.8%
2010	3,191		−6.5%
2020	3,083		−3.4%
U.S. Decennial Census

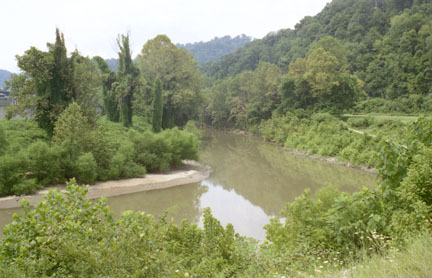
Tug Fork River at Williamson

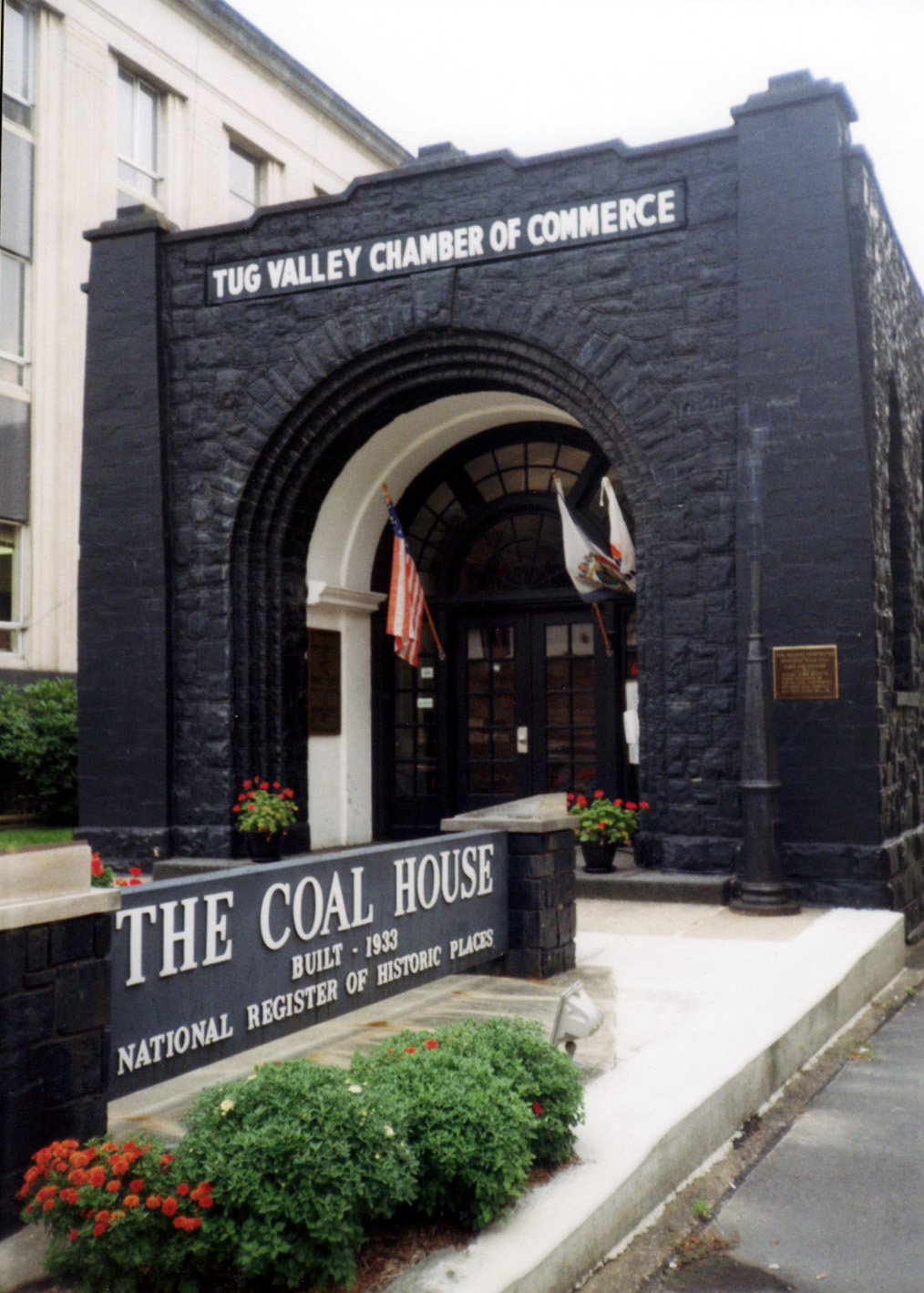
The Coal House in Williamson

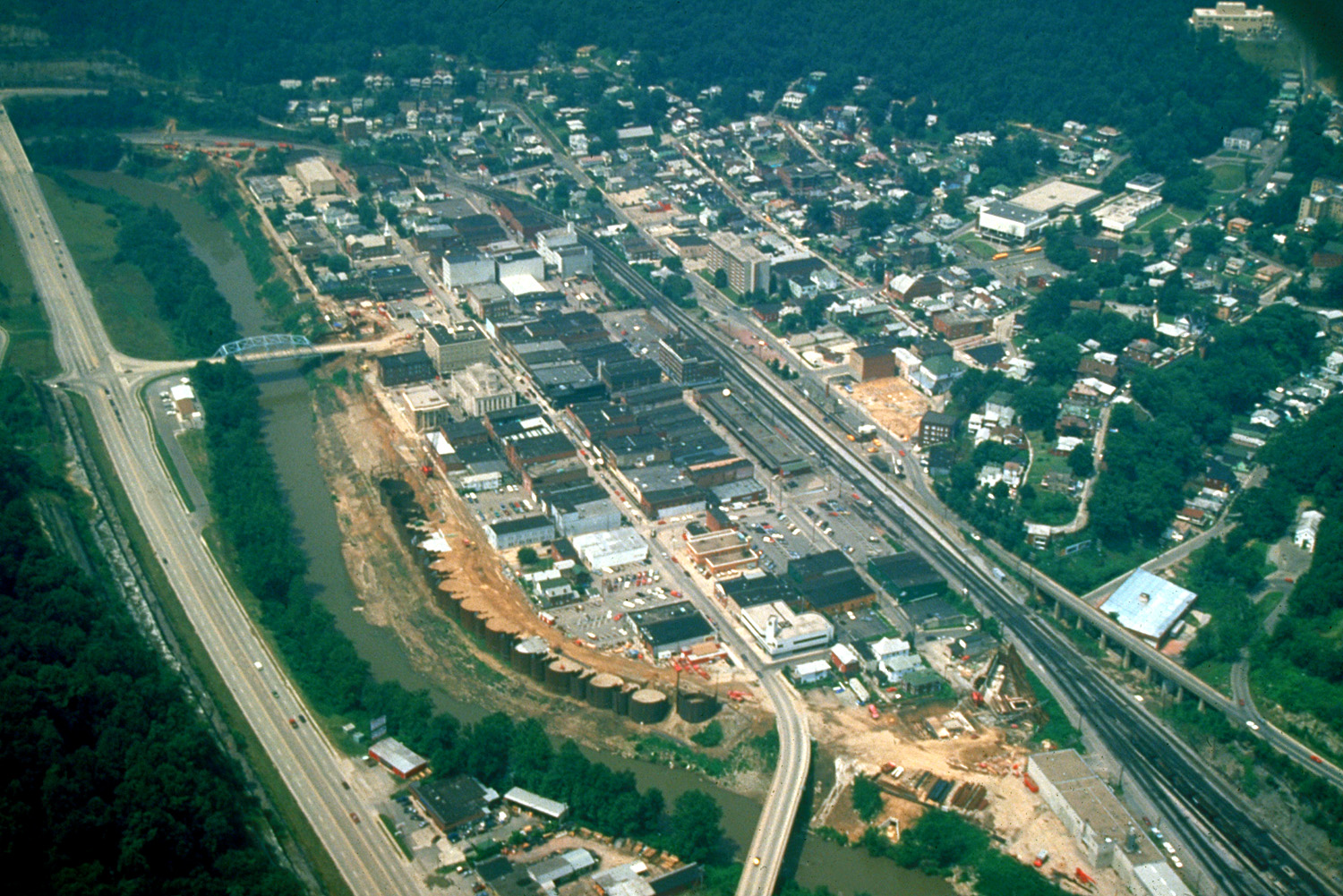
Aerial view of Williamson during construction of its floodwall, completed in 1991. The Tug Fork River is the border between West Virginia and Kentucky; the highway on the left (US-119) is in Kentucky.

=== 2020 census ===
As of the 2020 census, Williamson had a population of 3,083. The median age was 45.9 years. 19.9% of residents were under the age of 18 and 22.3% of residents were 65 years of age or older. For every 100 females there were 80.3 males, and for every 100 females age 18 and over there were 78.2 males age 18 and over.

0.0% of residents lived in urban areas, while 100.0% lived in rural areas.

There were 1,443 households in Williamson, of which 24.1% had children under the age of 18 living in them. Of all households, 29.9% were married-couple households, 20.9% were households with a male householder and no spouse or partner present, and 42.9% were households with a female householder and no spouse or partner present. About 44.4% of all households were made up of individuals and 18.1% had someone living alone who was 65 years of age or older.

There were 1,742 housing units, of which 17.2% were vacant. The homeowner vacancy rate was 4.6% and the rental vacancy rate was 11.3%.

Racial composition as of the 2020 census
Race	Number	Percent
White	2,599	84.3%
Black or African American	275	8.9%
American Indian and Alaska Native	16	0.5%
Asian	23	0.7%
Native Hawaiian and Other Pacific Islander	0	0.0%
Some other race	12	0.4%
Two or more races	158	5.1%
Hispanic or Latino (of any race)	32	1.0%

=== 2010 census ===
As of the census of 2010, there were 3,191 people, 1,524 households, and 835 families living in the city. The population density was 978.8 inhabitants per square mile (377.9/km^{2}). There were 1,885 housing units at an average density of 578.2 per square mile (223.2/km^{2}). The racial makeup of the city was 87.3% White, 9.4% African American, 0.2% Native American, 0.8% Asian, 0.1% from other races, and 2.3% from two or more races. Hispanic or Latino people of any race were 0.8% of the population.

There were 1,524 households, of which 22.0% had children under the age of 18 living with them, 36.4% were married couples living together, 14.3% had a female householder with no husband present, 4.1% had a male householder with no wife present, and 45.2% were non-families. 42.3% of all households were made up of individuals, and 16.7% had someone living alone who was 65 years of age or older. The average household size was 2.04 and the average family size was 2.76.

The median age in the city was 47.1 years. 18.6% of residents were under the age of 18; 6.2% were between the ages of 18 and 24; 22.8% were from 25 to 44; 31.2% were from 45 to 64; and 21.3% were 65 years of age or older. The gender makeup of the city was 45.2% male and 54.8% female.

=== 2000 census ===
As of the census of 2000, there were 3,414 people, 1,566 households, and 903 families living in the city. The population density was 1,022.6 people per square mile (394.7/km^{2}). There were 1,892 housing units at an average density of 566.7 per square mile (218.7/km^{2}). The racial makeup of the city was 83.51% White, 13.65% African American, 0.38% Native American, 1.00% Asian, 0.29% from other races, and 1.17% from two or more races. Hispanic or Latino people of any race were 0.91% of the population.

There were 1,566 households, out of which 24.1% had children under the age of 18 living with them, 39.0% were married couples living together, 15.3% had a female householder with no husband present, and 42.3% were non-families. 40.3% of all households were made up of individuals, and 18.0% had someone living alone who was 65 years of age or older. The average household size was 2.11 and the average family size was 2.85.

In the city the population was spread out, with 20.0% under the age of 18, 8.2% from 18 to 24, 24.0% from 25 to 44, 26.2% from 45 to 64, and 21.4% who were 65 years of age or older. The median age was 44 years. For every 100 females, there were 82.6 males. For every 100 females age 18 and over, there were 75.8 males.

The median income for a household in the city was $19,635, and the median income for a family was $35,893. Males had a median income of $36,250 versus $20,291 for females. The per capita income for the city was $15,303. About 22.1% of families and 28.8% of the population were below the poverty line, including 39.5% of those under age 18 and 18.2% of those age 65 or over.

== Arts and culture ==
The Coal House, whose walls are constructed from 65 tons of bituminous coal from the nearby Winifrede Seam, serves as the headquarters of the Tug Valley Chamber of Commerce. It was built in 1933 and is on the National Register of Historic Places. In October 2010, the interior of the Coal House was destroyed in a fire. The Coal House interior has since been restored while preserving the historical integrity of the building.

The Williamson Field House is a 6,000 capacity facility which was once home to the Williamson High School boys' basketball team.

The Hatfield–McCoy Trails, a popular network of ATV trails, run through the mountains surrounding the city, with numerous trailheads in and around the Williamson area. One of Hatfield–McCoy Trails has a community connector in Williamson area, Buffalo Trail which can be found on the W 4th Ave (coordinates: 37°40′39.0″N 82°16′57.1″W).

Each June, as many as 500 distance runners from around the United States and several foreign countries descend upon Williamson for the Hatfield–McCoy Marathon. Beginning in South Williamson, Kentucky, the race ends in the midst of the annual Hatfield–McCoy Reunion Festival in downtown Williamson.

== Media ==
- WXCC-FM
- The Williamson Daily News

== Infrastructure ==
=== Highways ===
- U.S. Route 52
- U.S. Route 119
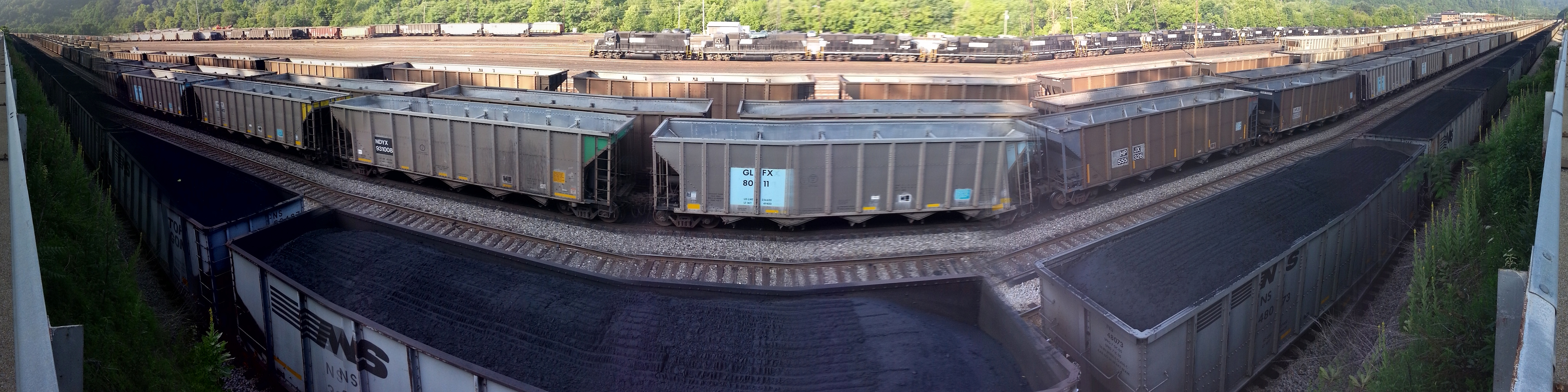
Rail yard in Williamson

== Notable people ==
- H. Truman Chafin, West Virginia state senator
- Robert H. Foglesong, U.S. Air Force general
- Greg Van Zant, former West Virginia Mountaineers baseball head coach
