= Cap Hatfield =

Hatfield-McCoy feud participant

- Born: 1863
- Died: Early 20th century

William Anderson “Cap” Hatfield Jr. was a murderer and former deputy sheriff of Logan county.

In 1896 Cap and his stepson murdered three men, both were found guilty of the murders a year later. While in jail Cap studied law and eventually became deputy sheriff of Logan county.

== Early life ==
William Anderson Hatfield Jr. was born in 1863. He was the son of Devil Anse and Levisa Hatfield. He was named after his father and probably nicknamed Cap after his father's service in the confederate army.

== Hatfield-McCoy feud ==
The Hatfield–McCoy feud involved two American families of the West Virginia–Kentucky area along the Tug Fork of the Big Sandy River from August 30, 1863, to May 7, 1891. The Hatfields of West Virginia were led by William Anderson "Devil Anse" Hatfield Sr., while the McCoys of Kentucky were led by Randolph "Randall" or "Ole Randall" McCoy. The feud gained national attention through tabloid coverage and has entered American culture as a metonym for any bitterly feuding rival parties.

The McCoy family lived primarily on the Kentucky side of the Tug Fork; the Hatfields lived mostly on the West Virginia side. The majority of the Hatfields, although living in Mingo County (then part of Logan County), fought for the Confederacy in the American Civil War; most McCoys also fought for the Confederates, except for Asa Harmon McCoy, who fought for the Union. The first real violence in the feud was the death of Asa as he returned from the war, murdered by a group of Confederate Home Guards called the Logan Wildcats. Devil Anse Hatfield was a suspect at first, but was later confirmed to have been sick at home with tuberculosis at the time of the murder. It was widely believed that his uncle, Jim Vance, a member of the Wildcats, committed the murder.

The Hatfields were more affluent and had many more political connections than the McCoys. Devil Anse's timbering operation was a source of wealth for his family, while the McCoys were more of a lower-middle-class family. Ole Randall owned a 300-acre (120 ha) farm.

== Election Day shoot out and imprisonment ==
During the elections in November of 1896, Cap and his 14-year-old stepson, Joe Glenn, killed the mayor of Matewan, Jim Rutherford.

Later that day Cap and Joe went to a store on their way home. At the store a crowd of men gathered outside; among the crowd was Jim Rutherford’s son John, who was drunk. When John and Cap saw each other, they opened fire. John was killed and so was John’s brother in-law Henderson Chambers, who ran outside the store to see what was going on.

On April 1897, at Mingo Circuit Court in Williamson, Cap and his stepson were found guilty for murder and sentenced to prison for one year.

== Career in law ==
While Cap was in prison he began to study law and continued to study it for six months at law school in Tennessee. He eventually passed the bar exam and stayed in Logan county.

Cap also became deputy sheriff of Logan county.

== Legacy ==
Cap had two children who became lawyers. His daughter became the first female attorney in Logan county.

== Sources ==
- Hatfield, George Elliott (1974). The Hatfields. Big Sandy Valley Historical Society.
- Pearce, John Ed (1994). Days of Darkness: The Feuds of Eastern Kentucky. University Press of Kentucky. ISBN 0-8131-1874-3.
- Rice, Otis K. (December 31, 1982). The Hatfields and the McCoys. University Press of Kentucky. ISBN 9780813114590.
- Waller, Altina L. (2012). Feud: Hatfields, McCoys, and Social Change in Appalachia, 1860–1900. Chapel Hill: University of North Carolina Press. ISBN 9781469609713.
