= Battle of the Grapevine Creek =

Last major conflict in the Hatfield-McCoy feud

Coordinates: 37.5801219°N 82.11503312°W

The Battle of Grapevine Creek was a short battle of large armed groups of the Hatfield family against McCoy family in 1888. It was the last offensive event, marking the end of the Hatfield–McCoy feud.

== Battle ==
Shortly after the capture and killing of Jim Vance in January 1888, the Hatfield family, led by Devil Anse Hatfield, prepared for one last major offensive attack in revenge against the McCoy family. When news of the Hatfields' war preparations reached the McCoy side, the Hatfields were already en route to invade the McCoy territory, so Frank Phillips, the leader of the McCoy posse, rounded up every able man he could and led his posse to intercept the invading Hatfields. Two McCoys were members of Philipps' posse, Bud McCoy and one of Randolph's own sons James "Jim" McCoy.

On January 19, 1888, both sides met around the area of the Grapevine Creek on the West Virginia side of the Tug Fork River and began exchanging shots at each other. One group from McCoy's side managed to lure the Hatfields into one area of the battlefield while another group of McCoys moved to outflank them, which caused the Hatfields to suffer multiple casualties and made them retreat. A number of Hatfields did not manage to escape and were taken prisoner by the McCoys.

== Aftermath ==
Some members of the Hatfield's side were taken as prisoners as a result of the battle. These prisoners alongside others whom they have caught prior to the battle were put on trial, with the permission of the Kentucky government. They were put on trial for various crimes they committed during the feud, such as the murder of the Randall McCoy's sons, as well as the murder of Ellison Hatfield and one of his daughters during the New Year's Eve massacre. All the Hatfields were found guilty and sentenced to prison terms, except for Cottontop Ellison Mounts – the illegitimate son of Ellison Hatfield – who was sentenced to death for the murder of Randall McCoy's daughter.

== See also ==
- Hatfield–McCoy feud
