= Newtown, West Virginia =

Newtown, West Virginia may refer to:

- Newtown, Fayette County, West Virginia, an unincorporated community in Fayette County
- Newtown, Mingo County, West Virginia, an unincorporated community in Mingo County

See also:

- Newton, West Virginia
