= Ephraim Hatfield =

Ephraim Hatfield may refer to:

- Ephraim Hatfield (1765-1855)
- Ephraim Hatfield (1811-1881)
