= Hatfield Cemetery =

Hatfield Cemetery may refer to:

- Hatfield Cemetery (Newtown, West Virginia), listed on the US National Register of Historic Places (NRHP)
- Hatfield Cemetery (Sarah Ann, West Virginia), NRHP-listed
