= Hardy, Kentucky =

Unincorporated community in Kentucky, United States

Hardy
- Unincorporated community
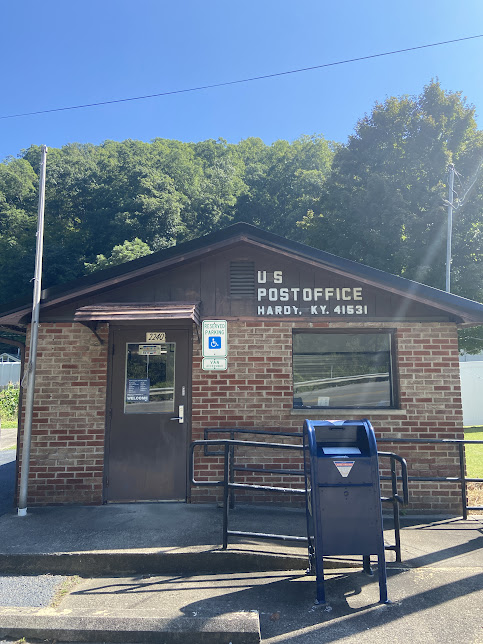
- Hardy post office

- Location within the state of Kentucky Hardy (the United States)
- Coordinates: 37°37′17″N 82°14′39″W
- Country: United States
- State: Kentucky
- County: Pike
- Elevation: 735 ft (224 m)
- Time zone: UTC-6 (Eastern (EST))
  - Summer (DST): UTC-5 (EST)
- ZIP codes: 41531
- GNIS feature ID: 508186

Hardy is an unincorporated community and coal town in Pike County, Kentucky, United States.

Hardy contained the homeplace of Randolph McCoy, patriarch of the McCoy family in the famed Hatfield-McCoy feud.
