= Abner Vance =

American veteran (died 1819)

Abner Vance (1760 or 1770 – July 16, 1819) was an American Revolutionary War veteran and murderer. He was also reportedly a preacher. He reportedly killed a man in 1817 and fled to Tug Fork. A few years later he was hanged for murder.

After he was hanged a folk song was made about him. The murder and subsequent execution is considered a founding an event for the Vances' settlement in Tug Fork Valley. Many of his descendants would be involved in the Hatfield-McCoy Feud. He is an ancestor of Vice President JD Vance.

== Early life ==
He was born in North Carolina. His name does not appear on census records but based on calculations from his wife's birth year he was born between 1760 and 1770.

He was an Indian fighter and saved men from Indian attacks. After he served in the American Revolutionary War he moved to Russell County, Virginia, sometime between 1780 and 1799. In 1792, he pushed Mingo people out of Guyandotte river.

He married Miss Susannah Howard. They produced eight children.

Reportedly he fled from Russell County to the Tug Fork in 1817 to escape a murder trail.

== Trial and execution ==
In June 1818, Abner applied for a coram nobis. The application was approved and a new trial was awarded.

He was executed on July 16, 1819, for murder in Washington County, Virginia.

== Legacy ==
Abner Vance's murder of Horton is considered a founding event for the Vance family's settlement in Tug Fork. Abner Vance was the grandfather to Devil Anse's mom and Jim Vance. According to author Lisa Alther, stories of Vance's hanging had a big impact on Devil Anse Hatfield.

Further down the line, he is an ancestor of 50th and current US Vice President JD Vance.

A song called Vance Song has been sung about the murder.
