= Hatfield Cemetery (Newtown, West Virginia) =

- U.S. National Register of Historic Places
- Location within West Virginia Location within the United States
- Location: South of Newtown on County Route 6, near Newtown, West Virginia
- Coordinates: 37°38′0.16″N 82°5′27.73″W
- Area: 1 acre (0.40 ha)
- Built: 1882
- MPS: Hatfield Cemeteries in Southwestern West Virginia TR
- NRHP reference No.: 80004033
- Added to NRHP: November 28, 1980

Hatfield Cemetery is a historic cemetery located near Newtown, Mingo County, West Virginia. The earliest burial dates to 1881, and is the grave of Ephraim Hatfield. The cemetery contains over 100 burials including Ellison Hatfield, brother of Captain Anderson "Devil Anse" Hatfield, whose killing by three sons of Randolph McCoy at an election in Pike County, Kentucky, in 1882 is generally regarded as the beginning of the famous Hatfield-McCoy Feud. It is a companion to the Hatfield Cemetery near Sarah Ann, West Virginia.

It was listed on the National Register of Historic Places in 1980.
