= The Hatfields and the McCoys (film) =

1975 TV film

- Genre: Action; Drama; Western
- Written by: Clyde Ware
- Directed by: Clyde Ware
- Starring: Jack Palance; Steve Forrest; Richard Hatch; James Keach; Robert Carradine
- Music by: Ken Lauber
- Country of origin: United States
- Original language: English

Production
- Executive producer: Charles W. Fries
- Producer: George Edwards
- Production locations: Universal Studios - 100 Universal City Plaza, Universal City, California
- Cinematography: Fred H. Jackman
- Editor: Nick Archer
- Running time: 90 minutes
- Production company: Charles Fries Productions

Original release
- Network: ABC
- Release: January 15, 1975

The Hatfields and the McCoys is a 1975 American Western television film about the feud between the Hatfields and McCoys starring Jack Palance, Steve Forrest, Richard Hatch, James Keach and Robert Carradine. The film originally aired as the ABC Movie of the Week on January 15, 1975.

During filming Carradine expressed interest that he and his brothers could play the Younger brothers in a proposed film Keach wanted to make where he and his brother Stacy played the James brothers. This led to the Keaches and the Carradines appearing in The Long Riders (1980).

== Cast ==
- Jack Palance as Devil Anse Hatfield
- Steve Forrest as Randall McCoy
- Richard Hatch as Johnse Hatfield
- Karen Lamm as Rose Ann McCoy
- James Keach as Jim McCoy
- John Calvin as Cotton Top
- Robert Carradine as Bob Hatfield
- Gerrit Graham as Calvin McCoy
- Morgan Woodward as Ellison Hatfield
