= Hatfields & McCoys (miniseries) =

2012 American miniseries

- Poster
- Genre: Western
- Teleplay by: Ted Mann; Ronald Parker
- Story by: Bill Kerby; Ted Mann
- Directed by: Kevin Reynolds
- Starring: Kevin Costner; Bill Paxton; Matt Barr; Tom Berenger; Powers Boothe; Andrew Howard; Jena Malone; Sarah Parish; Lindsay Pulsipher; Ronan Vibert; Joe Absolom; Noel Fisher; Boyd Holbrook; Tom McKay; Sam Reid; Jilon VanOver; Mare Winningham
- Composers: John Debney; Tony Morales
- Country of origin: United States
- Original language: English
- No. of episodes: 3

Production
- Executive producer: Leslie Greif
- Producers: Kevin Costner; Darrell Fetty; Herb Nanas
- Cinematography: Arthur Reinhart
- Editor: Don Cassidy
- Running time: 88–102 minutes
- Production companies: History; ThinkFactory Media; Sony Pictures Television

Original release
- Network: History Channel
- Release: May 28 – May 30, 2012

Hatfields & McCoys is a 2012 American three-part Western television miniseries based on the Hatfield–McCoy feud produced by History Channel. The two-hour episodes aired on May 28, 29 and 30, 2012.

== Premise ==
The miniseries recounts the feud between the Hatfields and McCoys (as well as the allies to both families), starting during the Civil War in 1863 and extending into the early years of The Reconstruction.

== Cast and characters ==
=== Main ===
- Kevin Costner as William Anderson "Devil Anse" Hatfield
- Bill Paxton as Randolph "Randall" McCoy
- Matt Barr as Johnson "Johnse" Hatfield
- Tom Berenger as Jim Vance
- Powers Boothe as Judge Valentine "Wall" Hatfield
- Andrew Howard as "Bad" Frank Phillips
- Jena Malone as Nancy McCoy
- Sarah Parish as Levicy Hatfield
- Lindsay Pulsipher as Roseanna McCoy
- Ronan Vibert as Perry Cline
- Noel Fisher as Ellison "Cotton Top" Mounts
- Joe Absolom as Selkirk McCoy
- Boyd Holbrook as William "Cap" Hatfield
- Tom McKay as Jim McCoy
- Sam Reid as Tolbert McCoy
- Jilon VanOver as Ransom Bray
- Mare Winningham as Sally McCoy

=== Recurring ===
- Damian O'Hare as Ellison Hatfield
- Greg Patmore as Elias "Good 'Lias" Hatfield
- Andy Gathergood as Skunkhair Tom Wallace
- Noah Taylor as Lark Varney
- John Bell as Billy "Audie" Dempsey
- Max Deacon as Calvin McCoy
- Jack Laskey as Sam McCoy
- Jonathan Fredrick as Jefferson McCoy
- Michael Jibson as Phamer McCoy
- Chad Hugghins as Harmon McCoy
- Tyler F. Jackson as Bud McCoy
- Katie Griffiths as Alifair McCoy
- Rebecca Calder as Martha McCoy
- Nick Dunning as Reverend Garrett
- Alixandra Fuchs as Kate Schoonover
- Michael Woods as Cat Miller
- Robert Moran as John B. Floyd
- Joy McBrinn as Betty Blankenship
- Jon Bloch as TC Crawford

== Synopsis ==
=== Part 1 ===
1863: Randolph 'Randall' McCoy and William Anderson 'Devil Anse' Hatfield fight together on the Confederate side in the American Civil War. Whilst Devil Anse Hatfield deserts before the war ends, Randall is taken prisoner.

Asa Harmon McCoy, one of Randall's brothers, fought on the Union side and is shot dead by Jim Vance Hatfield following an argument.

Lawyer Perry Cline is close to the McCoy family and attempts to cheat Devil Anse Hatfield out of his logging rights using a forged deed. The fraud is discovered, and in retaliation, Devil Anse Hatfield claims the logging rights to the McCoys' land.

1878: Floyd Hatfield owns a pig which Randall McCoy claims to recognise by the mark on its ear. Randall McCoy lays claim to the pig. In court, Bill Stanton testifies that the pig belongs to the Hatfields. In 1880, Stanton is killed by the brothers Sam and Paris McCoy. Although Judge Valentine 'Wall' Hatfield recognises the malicious nature of the crime, he releases Sam and Paris McCoy to prevent a feud between the two families.

1880: During an election event a romance between Roseanna McCoy and Johnse Hatfield starts. Roseanna misses the coach home and spends the night with the Hatfields. When she is taken home the next day, her father Randall disowns her. Roseanna returns to Johnse Hatfield.

'Bad' Frank Phillips is employed by the Pinkerton Detective Agency and is delivering an arrest warrant to a member of the Hatfield family. A shootout ensues. Among others, Phillips is shot in the back and has been limping ever since. Because of this incident, Phillips harbours a grudge against the Hatfields.

Roseanna McCoy is expecting Johnse Hatfield's child. Facing rejection from the Hatfields, she returns to McCoy country and finds refuge with her aunt. Lawyer Perry Cline courts her. In order to sever her ties with Johnse Hatfield, he incites Roseanna's brothers to kill him. Roseanna's brothers capture Johnse.

=== Part 2 ===
Roseanna informs Devil Anse that his son has been captured, and Devil Anse Hatfield manages to free Johnse with the help of his men.

1882, on election day, Ellison Hatfield is first stabbed and then shot by the McCoy brothers—Tolbert, Phamer and Randolph Jr. 'Bud'. The brothers are apprehended by the sheriff, who intends to take them to Pikeville. On the way there, the sheriff is intercepted by Devil Anse, who abducts the McCoy brothers. In an act of vigilante justice, the brothers are tied to trees and shot.

Randall McCoy and Perry Cline put bounties on the heads of several members of the Hatfield family. Bad Frank Philips manages to kill 'Skunk' Tom Wallace. Three attempts on Devil Anse Hatfield's life fail; in one of them, Paris McCoy is killed.

Johnse visits Roseanna at her aunt's house, but is turned away by her aunt. He then marries Roseanna's cousin, Nancy McCoy, much to the dismay of both families. The couple move into a house of their own.

Jefferson McCoy kills a postman. A bounty is then placed on his head. Jefferson flees to Johnse and Nancy's house. When Johnse visits his father and tells him about his guest, two Hatfields ride to Johnse's cabin and shoot Jefferson McCoy.

Nancy learns from Johnse where Selkirk McCoy (who tends to side with the Hatfields) is working and passes this information on to Bad Frank Philips. Bad Frank Philips arrests Selkirk McCoy. Bad Frank Philips is appointed Special Deputy by the Governor of the State of Kentucky.

=== Part 3 ===
The Hatfields plan to kidnap Randall McCoy on New Year's Eve 1888. His cabin is surrounded at dawn. Randall McCoy and most of his children manage to escape into the woods. His children Calvin and Alifair are shot dead by the Hatfields.

Nancy McCoy Hatfield leaves Johnse and marries Bad Frank Philips shortly afterwards. It becomes clear that she had only married Johnse out of a desire for revenge. Using the information provided by Nancy, Bad Frank Philips manages to corner Jim Vance and William 'Cap' Hatfield. Jim Vance is shot dead. Cap Hatfield manages to escape.

Judge Valentine "Wall" Hatfield turns himself in to the sheriff in Pikeville.

On January 19, 1888, the Battle of Grapevine Creek takes place between Randall McCoy, Bad Frank Philips and their men on one side, and Devil Anse and other Hatfields on the other. One of Devil Anse Hatfield's sons is killed, and Ellison "Cotton Top" Mounts is arrested by Bad Frank Philips.

At the subsequent trial, Wall Hatfield, Selkirk McCoy and another Hatfield are sentenced to life imprisonment. Ellison 'Cotton Top' Mounts is hanged.

Devil Anse Hatfield writes a letter to the newspaper expressing his desire to end the feud. The final scenes show Bad Frank Philips being shot in a fight, Randall McCoy burning to death in his house in 1914 whilst suffering from delusions, and Devil Anse Hatfield being baptised.

== Production ==
The miniseries was History's first aired scripted drama (the network had previously produced a scripted miniseries in 2011, The Kennedys, but decided against airing it in the United States).

Although the story is set in the Appalachians in West Virginia and Kentucky, the miniseries was shot in Romania, just outside Brașov with the Carpathians standing in for the Appalachians.

=== Music ===
The score for the series was composed by John Debney and Tony Morales, with additional music by Kevin Costner and Modern West. The soundtrack features vocals performed by Lisbeth Scott on The Long Road Down.

== Reception ==
On Rotten Tomatoes, the series holds an approval rating of 71% based on 24 reviews, with an average rating of 7.34/10. The site's critical consensus reads: "Hatfields and McCoys is a violent and gritty spectacle that perhaps takes itself too seriously." On Metacritic, the film has a weighted average score of 68 out of 100, based on 20 critics, indicating "generally favorable reviews".

Linda Stasi of the New York Post commented:

When I first heard about it, my thought was: Why? But that was before I sat through all six hours of this intense saga. Most miniseries this long tend to lose steam somewhere between the beginning of Night 1 and the middle of Night 2. Not this one...The miniseries is full of stand-out performances from great actors... But it's the guys you may not know who will blow you away.

Entertainment Weekly's Ken Tucker gave the series a B+, stating: "In stretching the tale over three nights, the pacing sags at times, and recriminations can get repetitive. It also doesn't help that Reynolds shot the miniseries in that perpetual sepia tone that gives everything a faux-antique look. But overall, Hatfields & McCoys is engrossing, and enlightening about a feud that proves to be a lot more than the bumpkin brawl of pop legend." Mary McNamara of the Los Angeles Times wrote:

Although deftly nailed into its time and place with sets and costumes so vivid you can smell the blue wood smoke and the stink of moonshine sweat, Hatfields & McCoys transcends the confines of its age by revealing the feud's posturing, resentments and callous violence that mirror the dynamics of modern urban gangs... It isn't a perfect piece—when faced with a choice between historic detail and story, Hatfields & McCoys errs on the side of detail, which is both the series' greatest strength and weakness.

Among the negative critics was Verne Gay of Newsday who called the series "violent and dull", adding:

What's not to like about Hatfields & McCoys? Simple: the story. It's an uninteresting one, peopled with almost criminally bland characters. In fact, as portrayed here—quite possibly accurately—they're a bunch of bibulous knuckleheads who shoot at each other year after year—or on TV, hour after hour—and have no real idea why. It's an interminable eye-for-eye, tooth-for-tooth narrative.

Washington Post's Hank Stuever also gave a negative review:

The point of the entire saga, it seems, is to make you lose track of what the feudin' was about, and how it managed to burn out of control. It will always be tempting to view their story through any modern analogy of one's choosing—such as partisan political stalemates or the red-blue socioeconomic divide. But maybe the story of the Hatfields and McCoys doesn't amount to anything at all. Maybe, since it also doesn't make much of miniseries, it was meant to be a footnote and nothing more.

=== Ratings ===
Part one drew the largest ever ratings for a History program and one of the biggest in cable TV history. 13.9 million viewers tuned into the first of three parts, making it the most-watched single broadcast on ad-supported cable ever, excluding sports. Demographic numbers were high as well, with 4.8 million viewers in the adults 18–49 demographic and 5.8 million viewers among adults 24–54. Part two was watched by 13.13 million viewers with an adult 18–49 rating of 3.7, the highest rated programming on cable of the night. Part three was watched by 14.29 million viewers with an adult 18-49 rating of 4.0, making it the number-one program of the night.

=== Accolades ===
Hatfields & McCoys received 16 nominations at the 64th Primetime Emmy Awards, the most since the History Channel began operations.

Year	Award	Category	Nominee(s)	Result	Ref.
2012	Artios Awards	Outstanding Achievement in Casting – Television Movie/Mini Series	Fern Champion and Amy Hubbard	Nominated	
2012	Critics' Choice Television Awards	Best Actor in a Movie/Miniseries	Kevin Costner	Nominated	
2012	Golden Eagle Awards	Entertainment – Drama	Leslie Greif, Nancy Dubuc, Dirk Hoogstra, Barry Berg, Kevin Costner, Darrell Fetty, Herb Nanas, and Vlad Paunescu	Won	
2012	Hollywood Post Alliance Awards	Outstanding Color Grading – Television	Lorraine Grant (for "Part 2")	Nominated	
2012	Hollywood Post Alliance Awards	Outstanding Sound – Television	Christian Cooke and Brad Zoern (for "Part 3")	Nominated	
2012	Online Film & Television Association Awards	Best Motion Picture or Miniseries		Nominated	
2012	Online Film & Television Association Awards	Best Actor in a Motion Picture or Miniseries	Kevin Costner	Nominated	
2012	Online Film & Television Association Awards	Best Actor in a Motion Picture or Miniseries	Bill Paxton	Nominated	
2012	Online Film & Television Association Awards	Best Direction of a Motion Picture or Miniseries	Kevin Reynolds	Nominated	
2012	Online Film & Television Association Awards	Best Writing of a Motion Picture or Miniseries	Ted Mann, Ronald Parker, and Bill Kerby	Nominated	
2012	Online Film & Television Association Awards	Best Ensemble in a Motion Picture or Miniseries		Nominated	
2012	Online Film & Television Association Awards	Best Cinematography in a Non-Series		Nominated	
2012	Online Film & Television Association Awards	Best Costume Design in a Non-Series		Nominated	
2012	Online Film & Television Association Awards	Best Editing in a Non-Series		Nominated	
2012	Online Film & Television Association Awards	Best Makeup/Hairstyling in a Non-Series		Nominated	
2012	Online Film & Television Association Awards	Best Music in a Non-Series		Nominated	
2012	Online Film & Television Association Awards	Best Production Design in a Non-Series		Won	
2012	Online Film & Television Association Awards	Best Sound in a Non-Series		Nominated	
2012	Primetime Emmy Awards	Outstanding Miniseries or Movie	Leslie Greif, Nancy Dubuc, Dirk Hoogstra, Barry Berg, Kevin Costner, Darrell Fetty, Herb Nanas, and Vlad Paunescu	Nominated	
2012	Primetime Emmy Awards	Outstanding Lead Actor in a Miniseries or a Movie	Kevin Costner	Won	
2012	Primetime Emmy Awards	Outstanding Lead Actor in a Miniseries or a Movie	Bill Paxton	Nominated	
2012	Primetime Emmy Awards	Outstanding Supporting Actor in a Miniseries or a Movie	Tom Berenger	Won	
2012	Primetime Emmy Awards	Outstanding Supporting Actress in a Miniseries or a Movie	Mare Winningham	Nominated	
2012	Primetime Emmy Awards	Outstanding Directing for a Miniseries, Movie or a Dramatic Special	Kevin Reynolds	Nominated	
2012	Primetime Emmy Awards	Outstanding Writing for a Miniseries, Movie or a Dramatic Special	Ted Mann, Ronald Parker, and Bill Kerby (for "Part 2")	Nominated	
2012	Primetime Creative Arts Emmy Awards	Outstanding Art Direction for a Miniseries or Movie	Derek R. Hill, Serban Porupca, John B. Vertrees, and Sally Black	Nominated	
2012	Primetime Creative Arts Emmy Awards	Outstanding Casting for a Miniseries, Movie or a Special	Fern Champion and Amy Hubbard	Nominated	
2012	Primetime Creative Arts Emmy Awards	Outstanding Costumes for a Miniseries, Movie or a Special	Karri Hutchinson and Adina Bucur (for "Part 1")	Nominated	
2012	Primetime Creative Arts Emmy Awards	Outstanding Hairstyling for a Miniseries or a Movie	Giorgio Gregorini, Peter Nicastro, and Gabriele Gregorini	Nominated	
2012	Primetime Creative Arts Emmy Awards	Outstanding Makeup for a Miniseries or a Movie (Non-Prosthetic)	Mario Michisanti and Francesca Tampieri	Won	
2012	Primetime Creative Arts Emmy Awards	Outstanding Music Composition for a Miniseries, Movie or a Special (Original Dramatic Score)	John Debney and Tony Morales (for "Part 1")	Nominated	
2012	Primetime Creative Arts Emmy Awards	Outstanding Single-Camera Picture Editing for a Miniseries or a Movie	Don Cassidy (for "Part 2")	Won	
2012	Primetime Creative Arts Emmy Awards	Outstanding Sound Editing for a Miniseries, Movie or a Special	Tom Bjelic, John Laing, John Douglas Smith, Mark Dejczak, Michael Mancuso, Dermain Finlayson, Kevin Banks, Darrell Hall, Alex Bullick, Nathan Robitaille, Dan Kiener, Emilie Boucek, and Steve Baine (for "Part 1")	Nominated	
2012	Primetime Creative Arts Emmy Awards	Outstanding Sound Mixing for a Miniseries or a Movie	Dragos Stanomir, Christian T. Cooke, and Brad Zoern (for "Part 1")	Won	
2012	Satellite Awards	Miniseries or Motion Picture Made for Television		Won	
2012	Satellite Awards	Best Actor in a Miniseries or a Motion Picture Made for Television	Kevin Costner	Nominated	
2012	Satellite Awards	Best Actress in a Supporting Role in a Series, Miniseries or Motion Picture Made for Television	Mare Winningham	Nominated	
2012	Television Critics Association Awards	Outstanding Achievement in Movies, Miniseries, and Specials		Nominated	
2013	American Cinema Editors Awards	Best Edited Miniseries or Motion Picture for Television	Don Cassidy (for "Part 1")	Nominated	
2013	American Society of Cinematographers Awards	Outstanding Achievement in Cinematography in Motion Picture/Miniseries	Arthur Reinhart	Nominated	
2013	Art Directors Guild Awards	Excellence in Production Design Award – Television Movie or Mini-Series	Derek R. Hill, Serban Porupca, John B. Vertrees, Vlad Roseanu, Grigore Puscariu, Elena Ioana, Ellen King, Sally Black, Aniela Ban, and Radu Ciocanau	Nominated	
2013	ASCAP Film and Television Music Awards	Top Television Series	John Debney	Won	
2013	BMI Film & TV Awards	Cable Mini-Series Award	Tony Morales	Won	
2013	Cinema Audio Society Awards	Outstanding Achievement in Sound Mixing for Television Movies and Mini-Series	Dragos Stanomir, Christian Cooke, Brad Zoern, Jeff Vaughn, Eric Apps, and Peter Persaud	Won	
2013	Costume Designers Guild Awards	Outstanding Made for Television Movie or Miniseries	Karri Hutchinson	Nominated	
2013	Directors Guild of America Awards	Outstanding Directorial Achievement in Movies for Television and Miniseries	Kevin Reynolds	Nominated	
2013	Golden Globe Awards	Best Miniseries or Television Film		Nominated	
2013	Golden Globe Awards	Best Actor in a Miniseries or Television Film	Kevin Costner	Won	
2013	Golden Nymph Awards	Outstanding Actor – Mini-Series	Kevin Costner	Nominated	
2013	Golden Nymph Awards	Outstanding Actor – Mini-Series	Bill Paxton	Nominated	
2013	Golden Reel Awards	Best Sound Editing – Long Form Music in Television	Kevin Banks and Darrell Hall (for "Part 2")	Nominated	
2013	Producers Guild of America Awards	David L. Wolper Award for Outstanding Producer of Long-Form Television	Barry M. Berg, Kevin Costner, Darrell Fetty, Leslie Greif, and Herb Nanas	Nominated	
2013	Screen Actors Guild Awards	Outstanding Performance by a Male Actor in a Miniseries or Television Movie	Kevin Costner	Won	
2013	Screen Actors Guild Awards	Outstanding Performance by a Male Actor in a Miniseries or Television Movie	Bill Paxton	Nominated	
2013	Western Heritage Awards	Western Documentary		Won	
2013	Western Writers of America Awards	Best Western Drama Script (Fiction)	Ted Mann, Ronald Parker, and Bill Kerby	Nominated	
2013	Writers Guild of America Awards	Long Form – Original	Ted Mann, Ronald Parker, and Bill Kerby	Won	

== Home video release ==
The series was released on DVD and Blu-ray Disc formats on July 31, 2012. The bonus material includes a music video of "I Know These Hills" from Kevin Costner and Modern West from their album Famous for Killing Each Other: Music From and Inspired By Hatfields & McCoys.

== Effect on tourism ==
According to WYMT-TV in Hazard, Kentucky, the series has generated an increase in tourism to the area from people wanting to know about the feud. Pike County Tourism Vice Chair Reed Potter said,

It's been beyond our expectations. We've been getting requests for brochures that tell about the feud sites and places people can visit at a rate today last I checked of about two per minute.
