= Hatfield Cemetery (Sarah Ann, West Virginia) =

- U.S. National Register of Historic Places
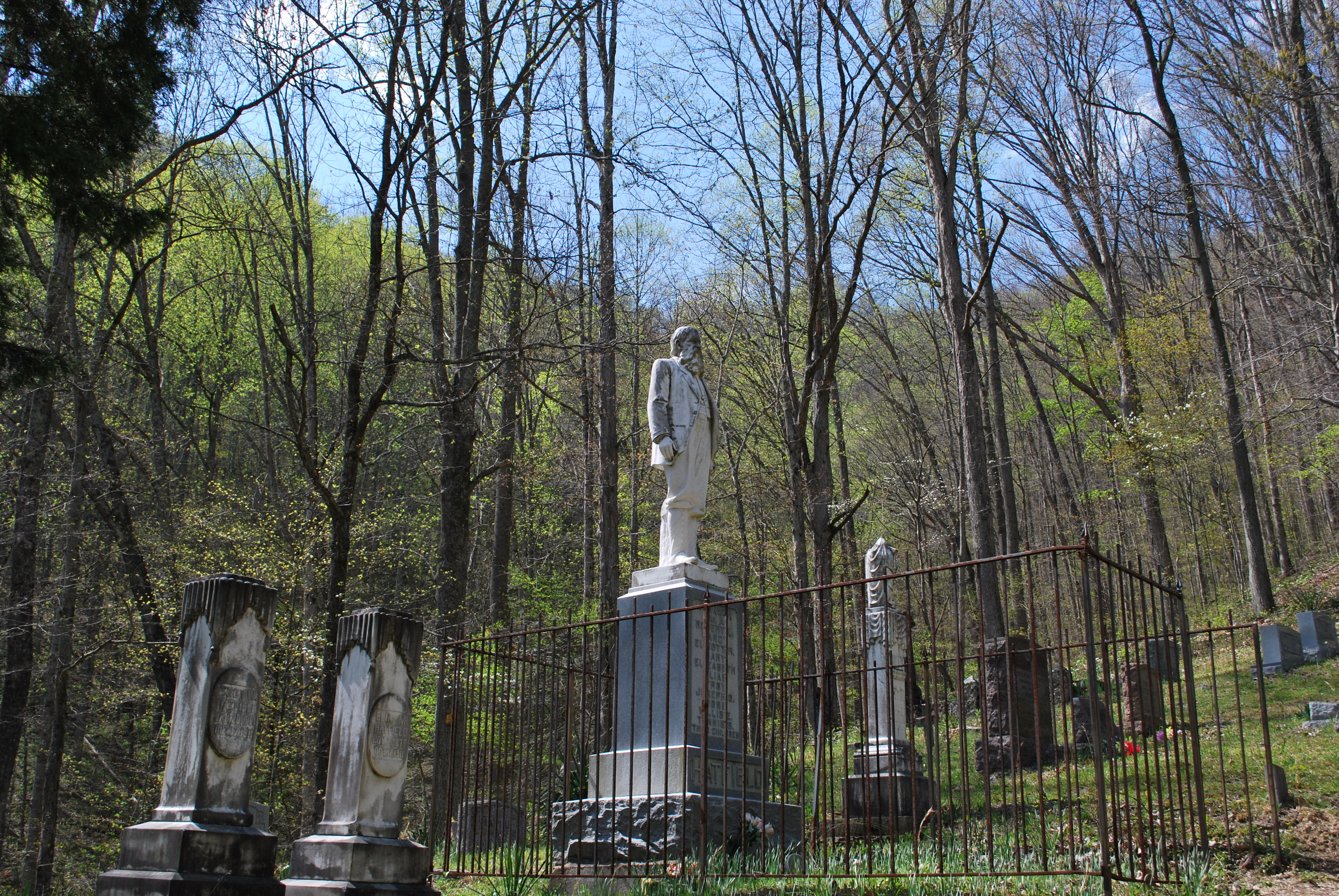
- Devil Anse Hatfield Grave, April 2009

- Location within West Virginia Location within the United States
- Location: South of Sarah Ann on WV 44, Sarah Ann, West Virginia
- Coordinates: 37°42′15.23″N 81°59′32.01″W
- Area: 1 acre (0.40 ha)
- Built: 1898
- MPS: Hatfield Cemeteries in Southwestern West Virginia TR
- NRHP reference No.: 80004030
- Added to NRHP: November 28, 1980

Hatfield Cemetery is a historic cemetery located near Sarah Ann, Logan County, West Virginia. The earliest burial dates to 1898, and is the grave of Captain S. Hatfield (1891–1898). The cemetery features the grave and monument with a life-size statue of Captain Anderson "Devil Anse" Hatfield, erected in 1926. It is notable as a burial place for members of the Hatfield family, early settlers of the region and participants in the famous Hatfield-McCoy feud during the 19th century. It is a companion to the Hatfield Cemetery near Newtown, West Virginia.

It was listed on the National Register of Historic Places in 1980.
