= Asa Harmon McCoy =

American slave owner, military veteran and murder victim

Asa Harmon McCoy was an American slave owner, American Civil War veteran, and murder victim.

His murder is viewed as the starting point for the Hatfield-McCoy Feud.

== Early life ==
McCoy managed to get out of poverty by marrying Patty Cline. Patty was the daughter of the valley's largest landowners, Jacob Cline. McCoy would move to Peter creek and inherit a farm from Jacob Cline.

== Service in American civil war ==
Asa’s military record is inconsistent.

At age 32 on February 12, 1862, McCoy enlisted as a private in Captain Cline’s company of Kentucky Home Guards. Just like his many of his neighbors in Peter Creek McCoy fought for the Union. Four days after his enlistment McCoy was wounded near Sandy River, tradition states that Devil Anse was the one to shoot him.

He fought on the side of the union despite him being a slave owner.

According to Otis K. Rice, McCoy was discharged on December 24, 1864. Rice states he was discharged at Catlettsburg.

== Death and legacy ==
According to one account, Jim Vance told McCoy that the Logan Wildcats would pay him a visit.

In 1865, Asa was shot and killed by the Logan Wildcats, although there was no conviction. The murder of Asa Harmon McCoy is considered the first incident in the Hatfield-McCoy feud.
