= Newtown, Fayette County, West Virginia =

- Unincorporated community
- Location within West Virginia Location within the United States
- Coordinates: 37°59′44″N 81°09′15″W
- Country: United States
- State: West Virginia
- County: Fayette
- Elevation: 2,011 ft (613 m)
- Time zone: UTC-5 (Eastern (EST))
  - Summer (DST): UTC-4 (EDT)
- Area codes: 304 & 681
- GNIS feature ID: 1555217

Newtown is an unincorporated community in Fayette County, West Virginia, United States. Newtown is 1.5 miles (2.4 km) north of downtown Oak Hill.
