= Ephraim Hatfield (1811-1881) =

American soldier (1811–1881)

- Born: 1811
- Died: 1881 (aged 69–70)
- Burial place: Hatfield Cemetery
- Military career
- Allegiance: Confederate States of America
- Branch: Confederate States Army
- Service years: 1861–1865
- Unit: 45th Virginia Infantry Battalion
- Conflicts: American Civil War

Ephraim Hatfield (1811-1881) was a farmer, landowner, and Confederate soldier. Tax records show that before the American Civil War, he was an important landowner. During the American Civil War, he fought on the side of the Confederates. When he died in 1881, his grave became one of the first graves in Hatfield Cemetery. On his death, he left land to his children, but disinherited his son Devil Anse Hatfield.

== Life ==
Ephraim Hatfield was born in 1811 to Valentine Hatfield and Martha Weddington. He was named after his grandfather, Ephraim Hatfield. At the age of 16 he married Nancy Vance when she was 15, and the couple moved to Mate Creek. They had 18 children, with only 10 of them surviving to adulthood.

During this time, Hatfleld reportedly acted as the local justice of the peace and resolved conflicts between neighbors, but was reported to be a quiet man.

In 1846, tax records show that he owned 215 acres of land on Mates Creek. In 1850, he owned 2 more tracts of land, one on Double Camp Fork and the other on Strait Fork.

Hatfield was reportedly over 7 feet tall and weighed more than 300 pounds. His huge size gained him the nickname Big Eaf. A newspaper published in 1895 tells a story of how he killed a bear in a fight: Another newspaper published in 1950 tells a similar story of how he killed a panther with a hunting knife. This tale gained him the nickname Old Panther Killer.

During the American Civil War Hatfield enlisted in the 45th Virginia Infantry Battalion when he was 51 years old.

Hatfield died in 1881 and was buried in Newton Cemetery on Mates Creek. Today, the cemetery is known as Hatfield Cemetery, and his grave is the earliest there.

== Children ==
Ephraim had the following children:

- Valentine born in 1834
- Elizabeth born in 1836
- Martha born in 1838
- Anderson (Devil Anse) born in 1839
- Ellison born in 1842
- Elias born in 1848
- Emma born in 1849
- Smith born in 1854
- Patterson born in 1854
- Biddie
