= Newtown, Mingo County, West Virginia =

Newtown, West Virginia
- Unincorporated community
- Location within West Virginia Location within the United States
- Coordinates: 37°37′40″N 82°05′08″W
- Country: United States
- State: West Virginia
- County: Mingo
- Elevation: 1,014 ft (309 m)
- Time zone: UTC-5 (Eastern (EST))
  - Summer (DST): UTC-4 (EDT)
- ZIP code: 25678
- Area codes: 304 & 681
- GNIS feature ID: 1555218

Newtown is an unincorporated community in Mingo County, West Virginia, United States. Newtown is 4.5 miles (7.2 km) east of Matewan. Newtown has a post office with ZIP code 25686.

The Hatfield Cemetery, near Newtown, is listed on the National Register of Historic Places.
