= Ephraim Hatfield (1765-1855) =

American pioneer (1765–1855)

Ephraim Hatfield (1765 – June 16, 1855) was an American settler in Kentucky and West Virginia. He was nicknamed Eph-of-All because he was the progenitor of the Hatfield family of Tug Fork, known for the Hatfield–McCoy feud.

== Biography ==
Hatfield was born in 1765 in Virginia. His father was Joseph Hatfield who was a woodsman and scout. His mother was either Rachael Smith or Elizabeth Smith. The Daughters of the American Revolution states that Rachel Smith is not the mother of Ephraim.

Hatfield lived in what is today Russell County, Virginia, around 1774. He married Mary "Polly" Smith Goff. The couple had four children: Joseph Hatfield, Aly "Alie" Hatfield, Valentine Hatfield, and Lydia "Biddie" Hatfield..

Hatfield's second wife was Anna McKinney Musick. She was previously the wife of David Musick, who was killed by the Shawnee near Honaker, Virginia, in August 1792. The Shawnee took Anne and her five children, who were rescued by Hatfield and five other men. According to the West Virginia Encyclopedia, Hatfield's rescue of Anna Musick was a founding event for the Hatfield family in West Virginia. Around 1820, the couple moved from Russell County, Virginia to Blackberry Creek in Pike County, Kentucky. Their six children were Mary "Polly" Hatfield, George Hatfield, Jeremiah Hatfield, Anna Hatfield, Peggy Hatfield, and Aik Hatfield.

Hatfield was nicknamed Eph-of-All because he was the progenitor of the Hatfield family of Tug Fork, known for the Hatfield–McCoy feud. Hatfield died on June 16, 1855, in Pike County, Kentucky.
