= Devil Anse Hatfield =

American patriarch of the Hatfield clan (1839–1921)

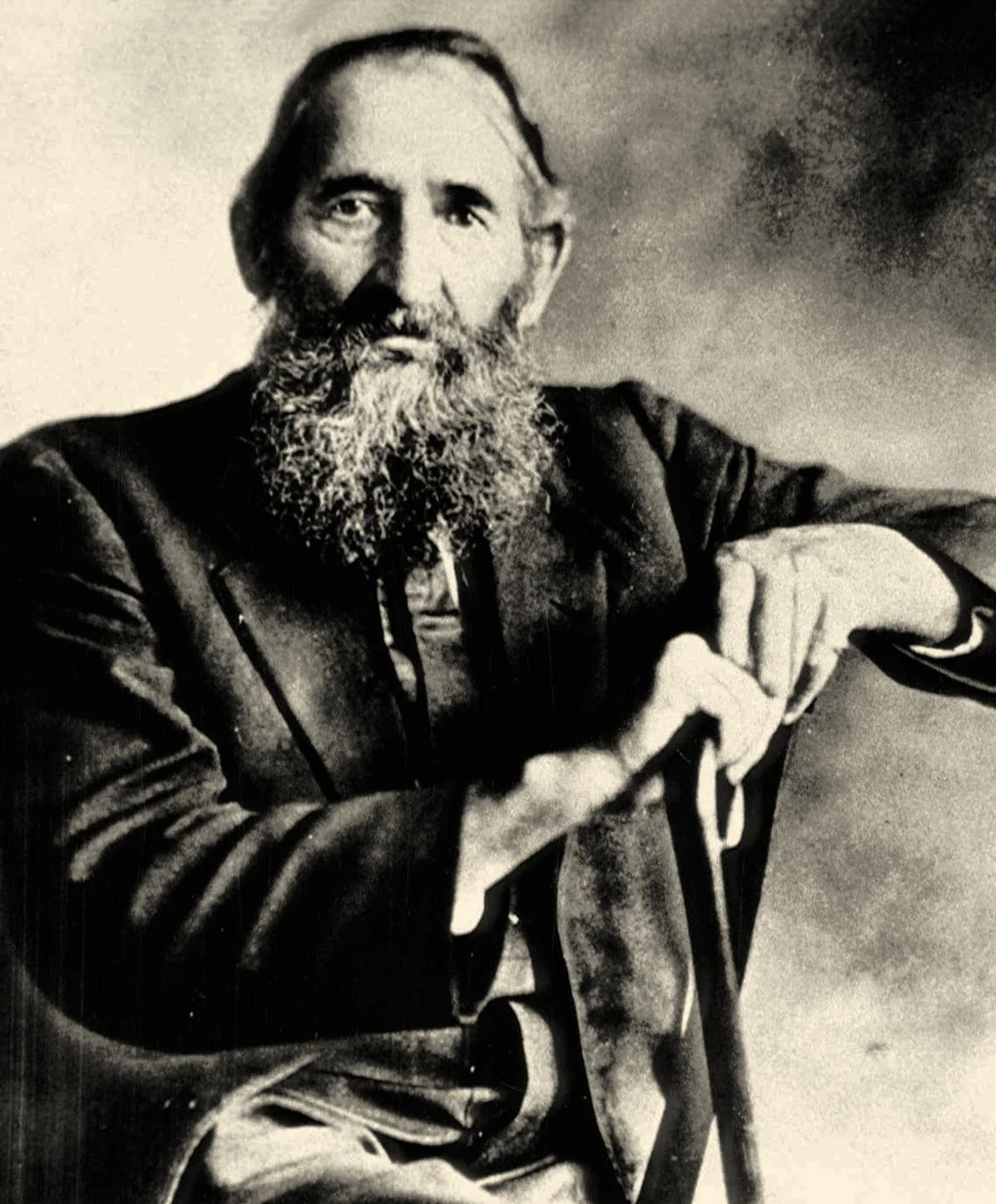
- Hatfield c. 1910
- Born: William Anderson Hatfield; September 9, 1839; Logan, Virginia, U.S.
- Died: January 6, 1921 (aged 81); Stirrat, West Virginia, U.S.
- Spouse: Levisa Chafin (m. 1861)
- Children: 13
- Military career
- Allegiance: Confederate States of America
- Branch: Confederate States Army
- Service years: 1861–1865
- Rank: Captain
- Unit: 45th Virginia Battalion Infantry
- Conflicts: American Civil War

William Anderson "Devil Anse" Hatfield Sr. (/ˈæns/; September 9, 1839 – January 6, 1921) was an American military officer who was the patriarch of the Hatfield family, whom he led in the Hatfield–McCoy feud. He previously served in the Confederate States Army during the American Civil War.

== Biography ==
Hatfield was born September 9, 1839, in western Virginia (now Logan, West Virginia), the son of Ephraim and Nancy (Vance) Hatfield. His nickname "Devil Anse" has a variety of supposed origins. Among these are that it was given to him by his mother; that he was named it by Randolph McCoy, patriarch of the McCoy family; that he earned the nickname for his bravery during battle in the American Civil War; or because it contrasted to his good-tempered cousin, Anderson "Preacher Anse" Hatfield.

A supporter of the Confederacy, Hatfield enlisted in the Confederate Army during the American Civil War. He was commissioned a First Lieutenant of Cavalry in the Virginia State Line in 1862, a group made to protect the territory along the Kentucky–Virginia border where resident loyalties to the Union and Confederacy were mixed. The Virginia State Line eventually disbanded in 1863 and Hatfield enlisted as a private in the newly formed 45th Battalion Virginia Infantry, before being appointed First Lieutenant and later Captain of Company B. His unit spent most of its time patrolling the border area against bushwhackers sympathetic to the Union as well as engaging in guerrilla warfare against Union soldiers. Devil Anse has been connected to killings of several Union fighters, including trackers Ax and Fleming Hurley in 1863.

Devil Anse and his uncle Jim Vance later formed a Confederate guerrilla fighting unit called the "Logan Wildcats." One of the group's victims was Union General Bill France, killed in revenge for losing one of their members to France's unit. In 1865, he was suspected of having been involved in the murder of his rival Asa Harmon McCoy, who had fought for the Union Army and was waylaid by The Wildcats on his return home. Hatfield had been home ill at the time of the killing, which was probably committed at the instigation of his uncle, Jim Vance. This may have sparked the beginning of the notorious feud between the two families.

Devil Anse deserted the Confederate Army in 1864 and returned home to his family in West Virginia where he began acquiring land. Despite being illiterate, he managed to build a profitable lumber business, much of which was on thousands of acres of virgin timberland he had won in a lawsuit from McCoy relative Perry Cline.

William Hatfield was the family patriarch during the Hatfield–McCoy feud. His family and Randolph McCoy's fought in one of the most well-known feuds in American history. He was instrumental in the execution of the McCoy boys: Tolbert, Pharmer, and Bud. He was present during the Battle of the Grapevine Creek. Later many of his sons and friends were arrested for the murder of the McCoys.

Hatfield was baptized on September 23, 1911, in Island Creek by William Dyke "Uncle Dyke" Garrett and converted to Christianity (he had maintained a largely agnostic or anti-institutional view of religion prior to this conversion). He went on to found a Church of Christ congregation in West Virginia. He was an uncle of the eventual Governor of West Virginia, and United States Senator, Henry D. Hatfield.

=== Marriage and children ===
Hatfield married Levisa "Levicy" Chafin (December 20, 1842 – March 15, 1929), the daughter of Nathaniel Chafin and Matilda Varney, on April 18, 1861, in Logan County, West Virginia (then Virginia). Their 13 children were:

Name	Nickname	Lifespan	Son/Daughter	Notes
Johnson Hatfield	Johnse	1862–1922	Son	Most known for his brief affair with Roseanna McCoy. Later married her cousin Nancy McCoy.
William Anderson Hatfield Jr.	Cap	1864–1930	Son	Killed Jeff McCoy in 1886. Deputy sheriff of Logan County, West Virginia
Robert Lee Hatfield	Bob	1868–1931	Son	Operated a saloon at Wharncliffe, Mingo County, during the 1890s
Nancy Bell Hatfield Vance-Mullins	Nannie	1869–1939	Daughter	Her first husband, John Totten Vance, killed James Thompson in 1897
Elliott Rutherford Hatfield		1872–1932	Son	Physician in Kanawha County, West Virginia
Mary Hatfield Hensley Simpkins Howes		1873–1963	Daughter	Her husband, Frank Howes, was a fiddler from Catlettsburg, Kentucky
Elizabeth Hatfield Caldwell	Betty	1876–1962	Daughter	
Elias M. Hatfield		1878–1911	Son	Murdered in Fayette County, West Virginia
Detroit W. Hatfield	Troy	1881–1911	Son	Murdered in Fayette County, West Virginia
Joseph Davis Hatfield	Joe	1883–1963	Son	Republican sheriff of Logan County, West Virginia
Rosada Lee Hatfield Browning	Rosie	1885–1965	Daughter	
Emmanuel Willis Wilson Hatfield	Willis	1888–1978	Son	Killed Dr. Thornhill in Mullens, West Virginia
Tennyson Samuel Hatfield	Tennis	1890–1953	Son	Republican sheriff of Logan County, West Virginia

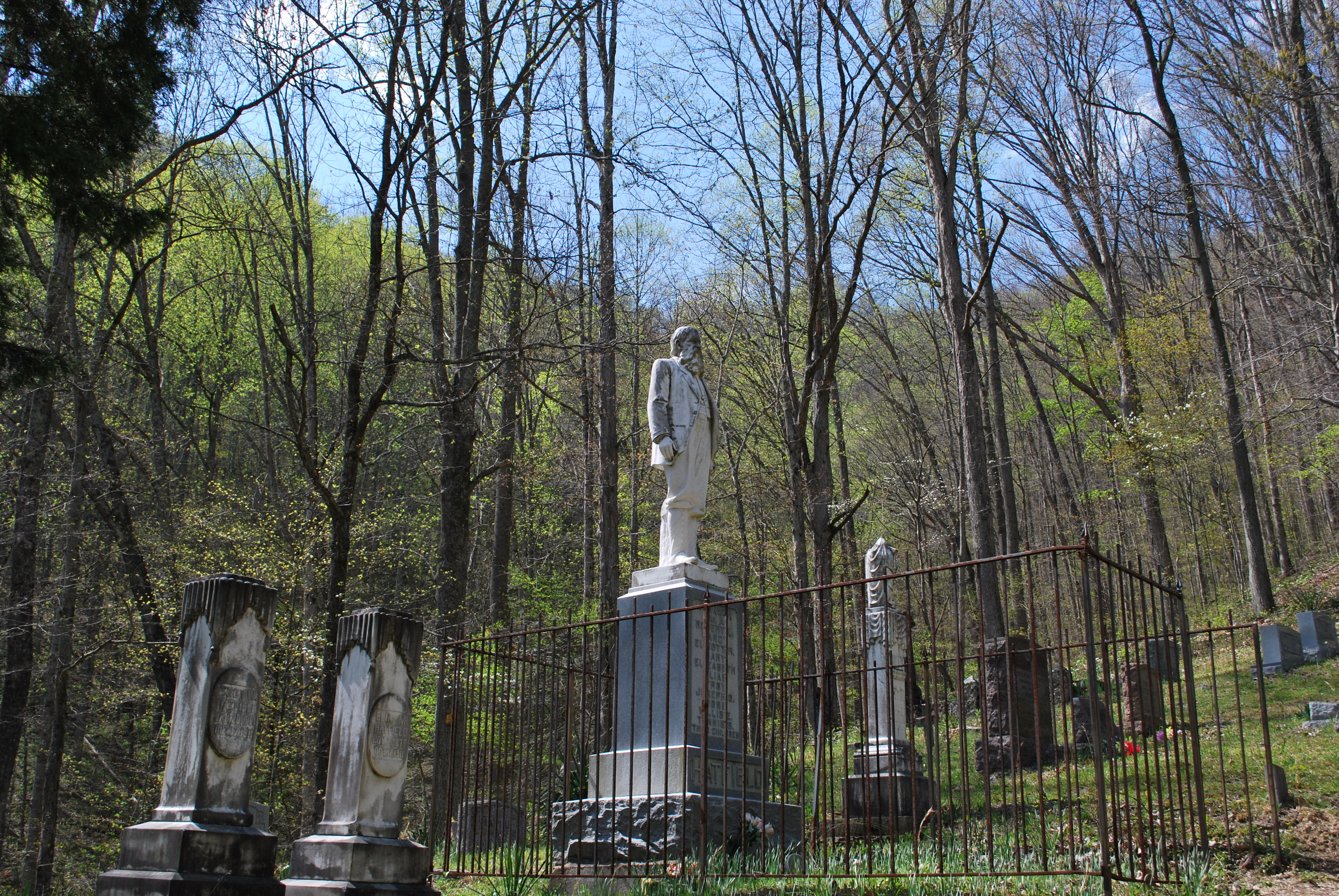
Hatfield Family Cemetery

=== Death ===
Hatfield died of pneumonia on January 6, 1921, at his home along Island Creek in Sarah Ann, Logan County, West Virginia at the age of 81. He is buried in the Hatfield Family Cemetery along West Virginia Route 44 in southern Logan County. His grave is topped by a life-sized statue of himself made of Italian marble. Levicy outlived her husband by eight years. Her great-nephew was the political kingpin and Logan County sheriff Don Chafin.

== In popular culture ==
Hatfield was portrayed by actor Kevin Costner in the 2012 miniseries Hatfields & McCoys. For his role, Costner won both the Emmy and Golden Globe for Best Actor in a Leading Role in a Miniseries or TV Movie.

In the 1975 TV movie The Hatfields and the McCoys, Jack Palance played Devil Anse Hatfield opposite Steve Forrest as Randall McCoy.

He makes a spectral appearance in Manly Wade Wellman's 1963 collection of short stories, Who Fears the Devil?.
