= Hatfield–McCoy feud =

Family feud in West Virginia–Kentucky, U.S.

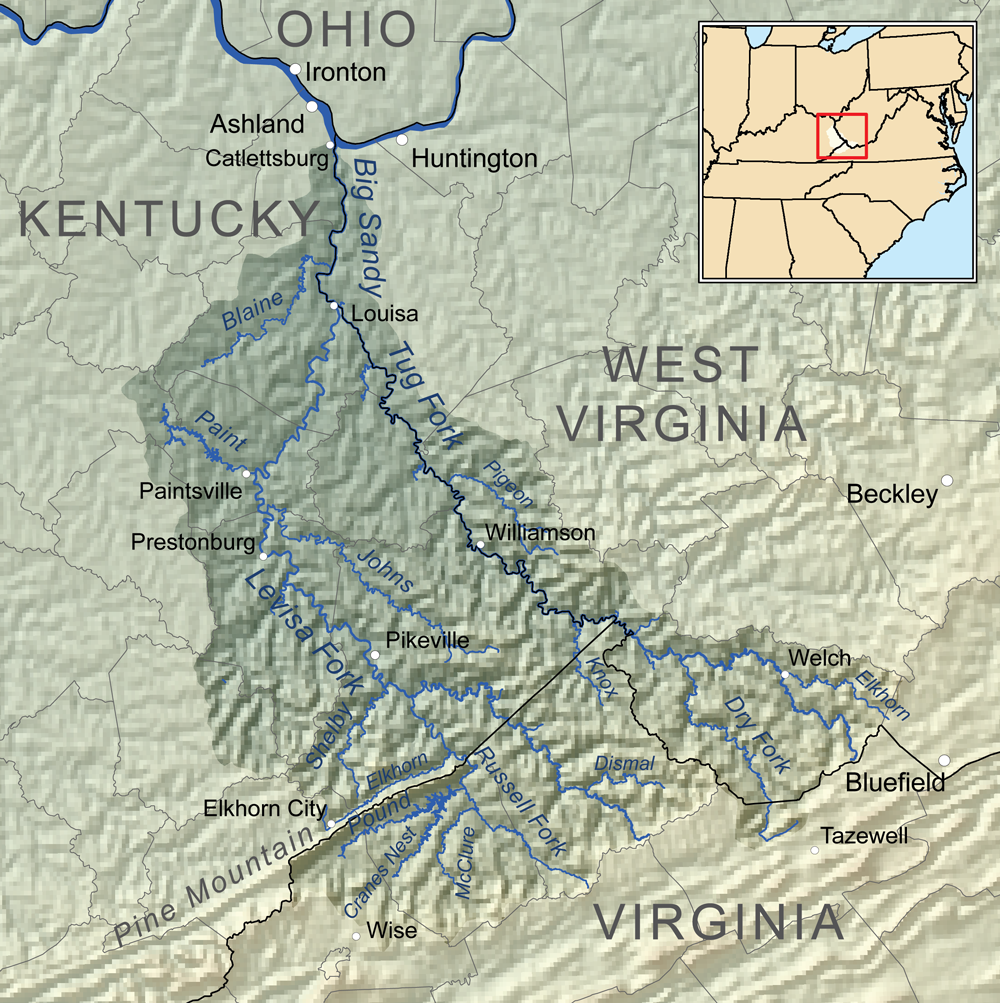
- Hatfield–McCoy feud site along the Tug Fork tributary (right) in the Big Sandy River watershed
- Date: August 30, 1863 – May 7, 1891
- Caused by: American Civil War, land disputes, revenge killings
- Resulted in: More than a dozen killed from both sides; Nine Hatfields imprisoned (including seven Hatfields who were imprisoned for life and one Hatfield who was executed)

Parties
Hatfield family and allies, led by Devil Anse Hatfield; Cap Hatfield; Ellis Hatfield †; Valentine "Wall" Hatfield (surrendered); Emanuel Willis Wilson	McCoy family and allies, led by Randall McCoy; Perry Cline; Franklin "Bad Frank" Phillips; Simon Bolivar Buckner

The Hatfield–McCoy feud involved two American families of the West Virginia–Kentucky area along the Tug Fork of the Big Sandy River from August 30, 1863, to May 7, 1891. The Hatfields of West Virginia were led by William Anderson "Devil Anse" Hatfield, while the McCoys of Kentucky were led by Randolph "Randall" or "Ol' Randall" McCoy. The feud gained national attention through tabloid coverage and has entered American culture as a metonym for any bitterly feuding rival parties.

The McCoy family lived primarily on the Kentucky side of the Tug Fork; the Hatfields lived mostly on the West Virginia side. The majority of the Hatfields, although living in Mingo County (then part of Logan County), fought for the Confederacy in the American Civil War; most McCoys also fought for the Confederates, except for Asa Harmon McCoy, who fought for the Union. The first real violence in the feud was the death of Asa as he returned from the war, murdered by a group of Confederate Home Guards called the Logan Wildcats. Devil Anse Hatfield was a suspect at first, but was later confirmed to have been sick at home with tuberculosis at the time of the murder. It was widely believed that his uncle, Jim Vance, a member of the Wildcats, committed the murder.

The Hatfields were more affluent and had many more political connections than the McCoys. Devil Anse's timbering operation was a source of wealth for his family, while the McCoys were more of a lower-middle-class family. Ole Randall owned a 300-acre (120 ha) farm.

== Feud ==
=== Civil War ===
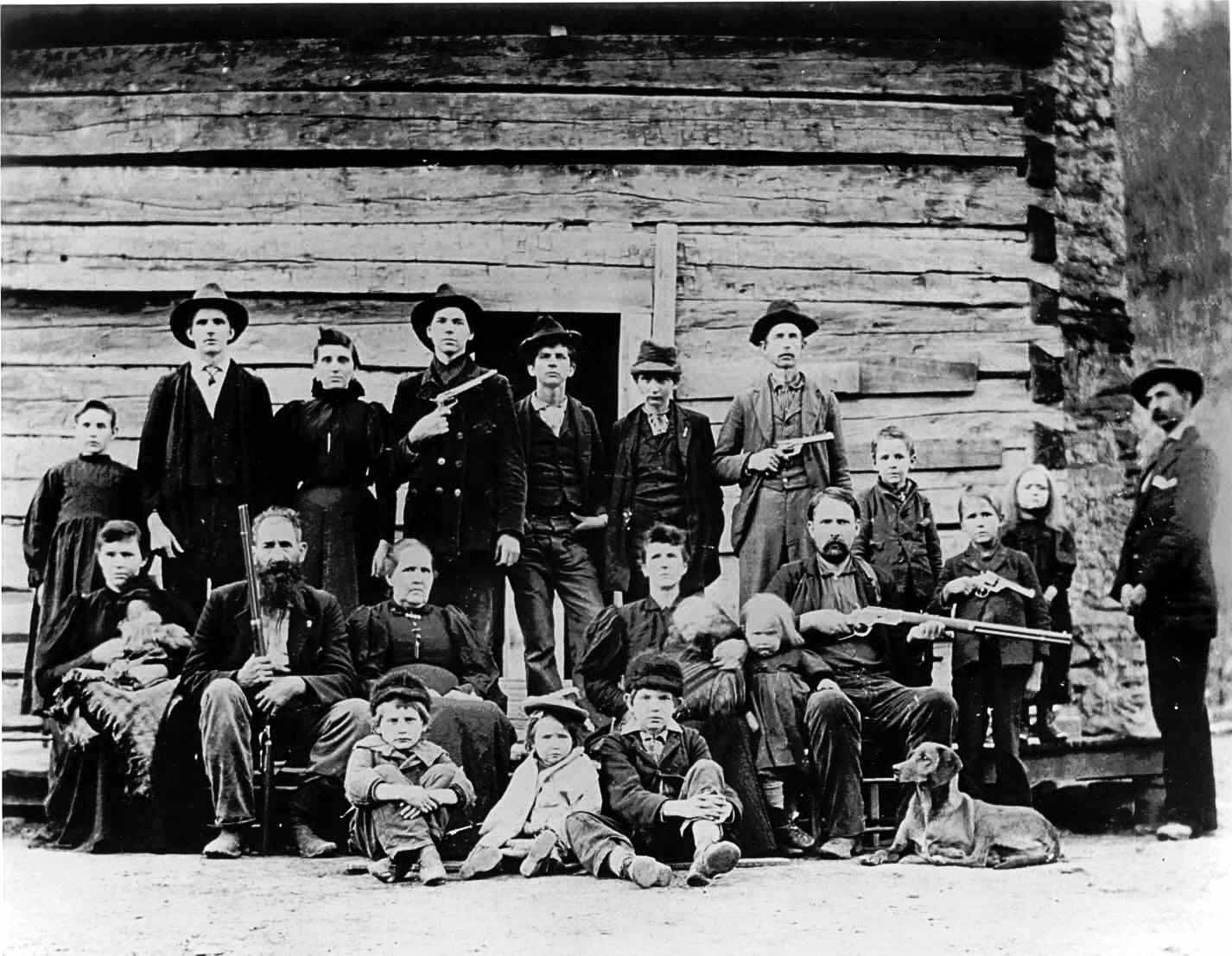
The Hatfield clan in 1897

One of the earliest known incidents occurred on August 30, 1863, when Devil Anse Hatfield got into an argument with Randall McCoy due to issues occurring in the month after the Battle of Gettysburg. Asa Harmon McCoy joined the 45th Kentucky Infantry on October 20. According to his Compiled Service Records, he was "captured by Rebels" on December 5, 1863, and was released four months later to a Union hospital in Maryland. At the time of his capture, he was recovering from a gunshot wound to the chest. During the early months of the Civil War, Asa joined a company of the Pike County Home Guards, under the command of Uriah Runyon, and it is thought he sustained the wound while serving in this unit. William Francis also led a company of Pike County Guards during 1862, a group of which attacked and shot Mose Christian Cline, a friend of Devil Anse Hatfield. Although Cline survived his wounds, Anse vowed to retaliate against the responsible parties. Sometime in 1863, a group of Confederate Home Guards ambushed and killed Francis as he was leaving his house, and Anse took credit for the deed. Runyon later joined the 39th Kentucky Infantry and was killed on May 7, 1864, in Pike County, Kentucky. His compiled service records say "Killed by Rebels".

On muster rolls beginning on May 6, 1864, Asa is reported in a Lexington hospital, suffering from a leg fracture. Beginning in December 1864, the 45th Kentucky Infantry began mustering its companies out of service. Asa's Company E was mustered out on December 24, 1864, in Ashland. He was killed near his home on January 7, 1865, just thirteen days after leaving the Union Army. A group of Confederate guerrillas took credit for the killing, and his wife's pension application states that he was "killed by Rebels". There are no existing records about his death, and no warrants were issued in connection with the murder. McCoy family tradition points to James "Jim" Vance, an uncle of Devil Anse and a member of a West Virginia militia group, as the culprit.

=== Escalation ===
The second recorded instance of violence in the feud occurred thirteen years later, in 1878, after a dispute about the ownership of a hog: Floyd Hatfield, a cousin of Devil Anse, owned the hog, but Randall McCoy claimed it was his, saying that the notches on the pig's ears were McCoy, not Hatfield, marks. The matter was taken to the local Justice of the Peace, Anderson "Preacher Anse" Hatfield, who ruled in favor of the Hatfields by the testimony of Bill Staton, a relative of both families. In June 1880, Staton was killed by two McCoy brothers, Sam and Paris, who were later acquitted on the grounds of self-defense.

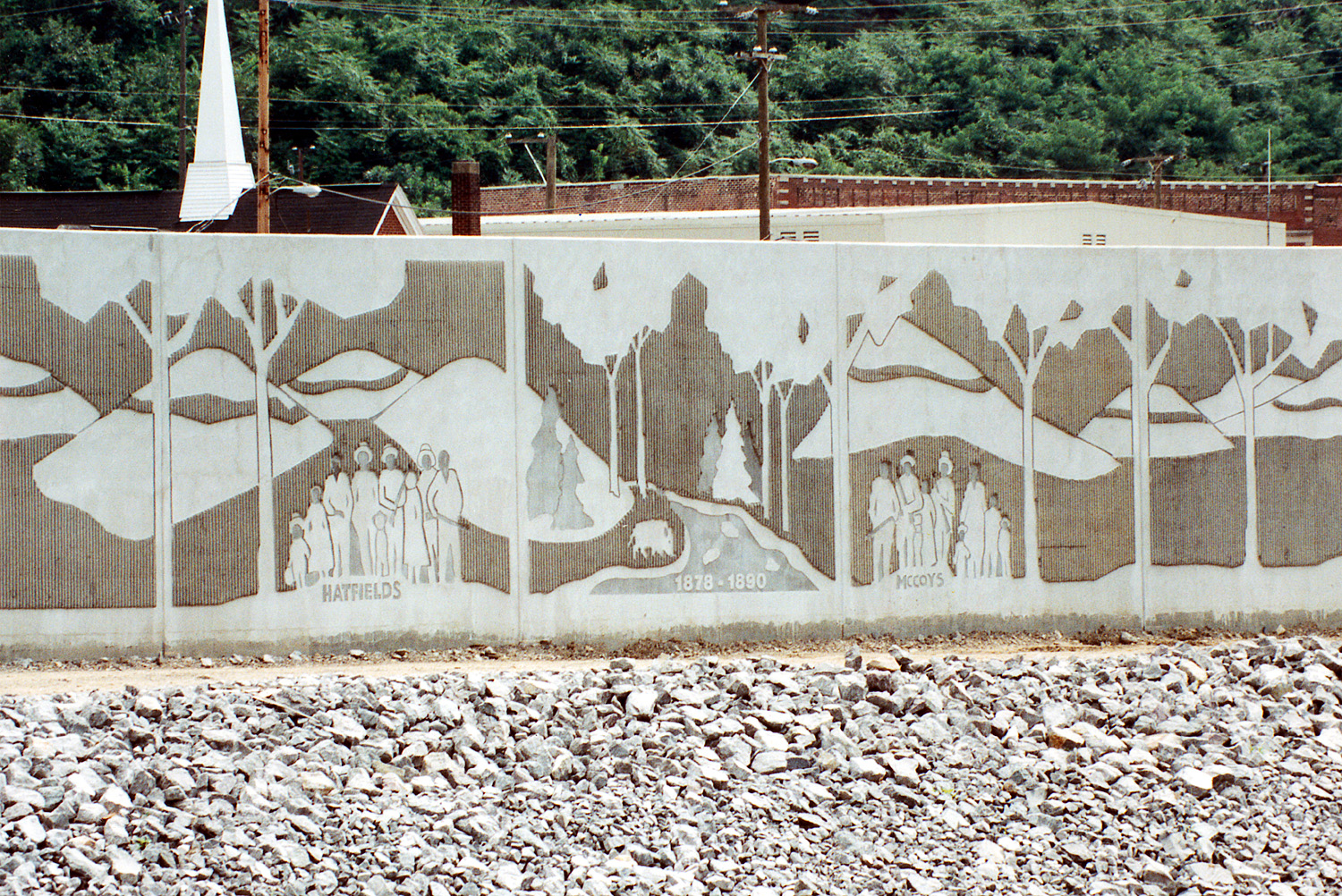
A section of the flood wall along the Tug Fork in Matewan, West Virginia, constructed by the U.S. Army Corps of Engineers, depicts the Hatfield–McCoy feud.

The feud escalated after Ole Randall's daughter Roseanna entered a relationship with Devil Anse's son Johnson, known as "Johnse" (spelled "Jonce" in some sources), leaving her family to live with the Hatfields in West Virginia. Roseanna eventually returned to the McCoys, but when the couple tried to resume their relationship, Johnse was arrested by the McCoys on outstanding Kentucky bootlegging warrants. He was freed from McCoy custody only when Roseanna made a desperate midnight ride to alert Anse, who organized a rescue party. The Hatfield party surrounded the McCoys and took Johnse back to West Virginia before he could be transported the next day to the county seat in Pikeville, Kentucky. Despite what was seen as her betrayal of her own family on his behalf, Johnse thereafter abandoned the pregnant Roseanna for her cousin, Nancy McCoy, whom he wed in 1881.

The feud continued in 1882 when Ellison Hatfield, brother of Devil Anse, was killed by three of Roseanna's younger brothers: Tolbert, Phamer (Pharmer), and Randolph Jr. known as "Bud". On an election day in Kentucky, the three McCoy brothers fought a drunken Ellison and another Hatfield brother; Ellison was stabbed 26 times and finished off with a gunshot. The McCoy brothers were initially arrested by the Hatfields' constables and were taken to Pikeville for trial. Secretly, Devil Anse organized a large group of vigilantes and intercepted the constables and their McCoy prisoners before they reached Pikeville. The brothers were taken by force to West Virginia. When Ellison died from his injuries, all three McCoy brothers were killed by the Hatfields in turn: they were tied to pawpaw bushes, and each was shot numerous times, with a total of fifty shots fired. Their bodies were described as "bullet-riddled". Soon, another McCoy, the second son of the murdered Asa, named Larkin "Lark" McCoy, was ambushed by an alleged West Virginia posse led by the Hatfields.

Even though the Hatfields and most inhabitants of the area believed their revenge was warranted, up to about twenty men, including Devil Anse, were indicted. All of the Hatfields eluded arrest; this angered the McCoy family, who took their cause up with Perry Cline, the deputy sheriff. Upon hearing of the meeting, Devil Anse resolved to stop Randall and sent gunmen to ambush Randall and his son Calvin, but the gunmen killed Randall's nephews John and Henderson Scott instead after mistaking them for their targets. Cline, who was Martha McCoy's brother, is believed to have used his political connections to reinstate the charges and announced rewards for the Hatfields' arrests as an act of revenge. A few years prior, Cline had lost a lawsuit against Anse over the deed to thousands of acres of land, subsequently increasing the hatred between the two families.

Days after the killing of the Scotts, acting constable William Anderson "Cap" Hatfield II and family friend Tom Wallace broke into the house of Bill Daniels and flogged his wife Mary, sister of Jeff McCoy, whom they suspected of warning her brother's family of danger. Jeff McCoy heard of the whipping in 1886 while on the run for the murder of mail carrier Fred Wolford. Infuriated, he and his friend Josiah Hurley set out to capture Tom Wallace and take him to jail in Pikeville, but he escaped them. As Jeff tried to flee, he was shot dead by Cap and Wallace on the banks of the Tug Fork. Two other McCoys, Jake and Larkin, once again attempted to arrest Wallace for the assault on Mary Daniels in August 1887, but he managed to escape from jail; he was found murdered the following year, likely by the McCoys. Larkin was the second son of the murdered Asa McCoy. He too was ambushed and murdered by an alleged West Virginia posse led by the Hatfields.

=== New Year's Massacre ===
The feud reached its peak during the 1888 New Year's Night Massacre. Cap and Vance led several members of the Hatfield clan to surround the McCoy cabin and opened fire on the sleeping family. Awakened by the shooting, the McCoys managed to grab their weapons and fired back. The cabin was then set on fire in an effort to drive the McCoys into the open.

Panicking, the McCoys rushed to every exit they could find. Randolph managed to escape and hide inside the pig pen. Most of his children managed to escape into the woods. Two of his children, Calvin and Alifair, were shot and killed near the family well as they exited their home. His wife, Sarah, was caught, beaten, and almost killed by Vance and Johnse. With his house burning, Randall and his remaining family members were able to escape farther into the wilderness; his children, unprepared for the elements, suffered frostbite. The remaining McCoys moved to Pikeville to escape the West Virginia raiding parties.

=== Battle of the Grapevine Creek ===
Between 1880 and 1891, the feud claimed more than a dozen members of the two families. On one occasion, the governors of West Virginia and Kentucky even threatened to have their militias invade each other's states. In response, Kentucky Governor S. B. Buckner sent his Adjutant General Sam Hill to Pike County to investigate the situation.

A few days after the New Year's Massacre, a posse led by Pike County Deputy Sheriff Frank "Bad Frank" Phillips rode out to track down Anse's group across the state line into West Virginia. Two McCoys were members of Phillips' posse, Bud and one of Randolph's sons, James "Jim" McCoy. The posse's first victim was Vance, who was killed in the woods after he refused to be arrested. Phillips then made other successive raids on Hatfield homes and supporters, capturing many and killing another three Hatfield supporters, before cornering the rest in Grapevine Creek on January 19. Anse and other Hatfields were waiting for them with an armed group of their own. A battle ensued between the two parties, and the Hatfields were eventually apprehended. A deputy, Bill Dempsey, was wounded and executed by Frank Phillips after they surrendered. On August 24, 1888, eight of the Hatfields and their friends were indicted for the murder of Randolph's young daughter Alifair McCoy (sometimes spelled Allaphare), who was killed during the New Year's Massacre. They included Cap, Johnse, Robert and Elliot Hatfield, Ellison "Cotton Top" Mounts, French Ellis, Charles Gillespie, and Thomas Chambers.

=== Trial ===
Because of issues of due process and illegal extradition, the United States Supreme Court became involved (Mahon v. Justice, 127 U.S. 700 (1888)). The Supreme Court ruled 7–2 in favor of Kentucky, holding that, even if a fugitive is returned from the asylum state illegally instead of through lawful extradition procedure, no federal law prevents him from being tried. Eventually, the men were tried in Kentucky, and all were found guilty. Seven received life imprisonment, while the eighth, Ellison "Cottontop" Mounts, was executed by hanging and buried in an unmarked grave within sight of the gallows.

Ellison had tried to retract his confession, stating that he was innocent and that he had only confessed because he expected leniency, but his retraction was denied. Thousands attended his hanging in Pikeville, but though the scaffold was in the open, its base was fenced in to comply with laws that had been passed which prohibited public executions. The hanging site is the current location of a classroom building of the present-day University of Pikeville. With his last words, Ellison claimed that: "The Hatfields made me do it." No one had been sent to the gallows in Pike County for forty years, and after Ellison, no one ever was again.

Of those sent to prison:

- Valentine "Wall" or "Uncle Wall" Hatfield, elder brother of Devil Anse, was overshadowed by Devil Anse's ambitions but was one of the eight convicted, dying in prison of unknown causes on February 13, 1890, at the age of 55. He had petitioned his brothers to assist in his emancipation from jail, but none came for fear of being captured and brought to trial. He was buried in the prison cemetery, which has since been paved over.
- Doc D. Mahon, son-in-law of Valentine and brother of Plyant, one of the eight Hatfields convicted, served 14 years in prison before returning home to live with his son, Melvin.
- Plyant Mahon, son-in-law of Valentine, served fourteen years in prison before returning home to rejoin his ex-wife, who had remarried but left her second husband to live with Plyant again.

Fighting between the families eased following the hanging of Mounts. The fighting was declared to be over on May 7, 1891. Trials continued for years until the 1901 trial of Johnse, who was sentenced to life imprisonment for his involvement in the New Year's Massacre in the last of the feud trials.

== Genetic disease ==
The feud may have been caused in part by Von Hippel–Lindau disease, a genetic disease in the McCoy family, which causes a predisposition to anger. Von Hippel-Lindau disease can also cause benign tumors known as pheochromocytomas that tend to grow in the adrenal glands. This disease is inherited genetically and is caused by a mutation in a tumor-suppressor gene on chromosome 3. Effects on the body can occur due to massive amounts of catecholamines, such as adrenaline this will trigger more of the body's natural "fight or flight " mode.

== In the modern era ==
In 1979, the families united for a special week's taping of the popular game show Family Feud, in which they played for a cash prize and a pig that was kept on stage during the games. The McCoy family won the week-long series three games to two. While the Hatfield family won more money – $11,272.32 to the McCoys' $8,459.53—the decision was made to augment the McCoy family's winnings to $11,273.37.

Tourists travel to those parts of West Virginia and Kentucky each year to examine the relics that remain from the days of the feud. In 1999, a large project known as the "Hatfield and McCoy Historic Site Restoration" was completed, funded by a federal grant from the Small Business Administration. Many improvements to various feud sites were completed. A committee of local historians spent months researching reams of information to find out about the factual history of the events surrounding the feud. This research was compiled in an audio compact disc, the Hatfield–McCoy Feud Driving Tour, which is available only at the Pike County Tourism CVB Visitors Center in Pikeville. The CD is a self-guided driving tour of the restored feud sites and includes maps and pictures as well as the audio CD. The driving tour leads visitors to feud-related points of interest, including the gravesites of the feudists, the "Hog Trial Cabin", also known as Valentine Hatfield's cabin, Randolph McCoy's homeplace and well in Hardy, Kentucky, Aunt Betty's House, and many more sites, some complete with historical markers.

Great-great-great-grandsons Bo McCoy and Ron McCoy of feud patriarch Randolph McCoy organized a joint family reunion of the Hatfield and McCoy families in 2000 that garnered national attention. More than 5,000 people attended.

In 2002, Bo and Ron McCoy brought a lawsuit to acquire access to the McCoy Cemetery, which holds the graves of six family members, including five slain during the feud. The McCoys took on a private property owner, John Vance, who had restricted access to the cemetery.

In the 2000s, a 500-mile (800 km) all-terrain vehicle trail system, the Hatfield–McCoy Trails, was created around the theme of the feud.

On June 14, 2003, in Pikeville, Kentucky, the McCoy cousins partnered with Reo Hatfield of Waynesboro, Virginia, to declare an official truce between the families. Reo Hatfield said that he wanted to show that if the two families could reach an accord, others could also. He had said that he wanted to send a broader message to the world that when national security is at risk, Americans put their differences aside and stand united: "We're not saying you don't have to fight because sometimes you do have to fight," he said. "But you don't have to fight forever." Signed by more than sixty descendants during the fourth Hatfield–McCoy Festival, the truce was touted as a proclamation of peace, saying, "We ask by God's grace and love that we be forever remembered as those that bound together the hearts of two families to form a family of freedom in America." Governor Paul E. Patton of Kentucky and Governor Bob Wise of West Virginia signed proclamations declaring June 14 Hatfield and McCoy Reconciliation Day. Ron McCoy, one of the festival's founders, said it is unknown where the three signed proclamations will be exhibited and that "the Hatfields and McCoys symbolize violence and feuding and fighting, but by signing this, hopefully people will realize that's not the final chapter."

The Hatfield and McCoy Reunion Festival and Marathon are held annually in June on a three-day weekend. The events take place in Pikeville, Kentucky, Matewan, West Virginia, and Williamson, West Virginia. The festival commemorates the famed feud and includes a marathon and half-marathon (the motto is "no feudin', just runnin'"), in addition to an ATV ride in all three towns. There is also a tug-of-war across the Tug Fork tributary near which the feuding families lived, a live re-enactment of scenes from their most famous fight, a motorcycle ride, live entertainment, Hatfield–McCoy landmark tours, a cornbread contest, pancake breakfast, arts, crafts, and dancing. Launched in 2000, the festival typically attracts thousands, with more than 300 runners taking part in the races.

In August 2015, members of both families helped archeologists dig for ruins at a site where they believe Randolph McCoy's house was burned.

On September 25, 2018, a wooden statue, standing over 8 feet tall, was erected in honor of Randolph McCoy at the McCoy homeplace in Hardy, Kentucky. Carved by chainsaw carver Travis Williams and donated to the property, this statue had been commissioned by McCoy property owner and Hatfield descendant Bob Scott. The statue was unveiled during Hatfield-McCoy Heritage Days in Pike County, Kentucky, an event that occurs every September and brings Hatfield and McCoy descendants back to Pike County to celebrate the long-standing peace between the families. The McCoy homeplace, like many others associated with the feud, is open to tourists year-round.

On September 24, 2024, following a shooting on Interstate 75 in Kentucky, the body of the shooter, Joseph Couch was discovered by Fred and Sheila McCoy, who run a museum in Liberty about the feud, and found the body while streaming on YouTube. Fred is related to both the Hatfield and McCoy families.

== In popular culture ==
=== Film ===
The 1923 Buster Keaton comedy Our Hospitality centers on the "Canfield–McKay feud," a fictionalized version of the Hatfield–McCoy feud.

The 1938 Merrie Melodies cartoon A Feud There Was depicts a feud between two backwoods families, called the Weavers and the McCoys. It features Elmer Fudd (an early version before he became a hunter) - trying to put an end to the feuding between the two hillbilly clans.

The 1939 Max Fleischer cartoon Musical Mountaineers has Betty Boop wander into the territory of the Peters family, who are at war with the Hatfields.

The 1943 Walter Lantz Swing Symphony cartoon Pass the Biscuits Mirandy! depicts the feud between the Foys and Bartons, based on the lyrics of a song of the same title.

The 1946 Disney cartoon short The Martins and the Coys in Make Mine Music animated feature was another very thinly disguised caricature of the Hatfield–McCoy feud.

In 1949, the Samuel Goldwyn feature film Roseanna McCoy told a fictionalized version of the romance between the title character, played by Joan Evans, and Johnse Hatfield, played by Farley Granger.

The 1949 Screen Songs short "Comin' Round the Mountain" features another thinly disguised caricature of the Hatfield–McCoy feud, with cats (called "Catfields") and dogs ("McHounds") fighting each other until a new school teacher arrives.

In 1950, Warner Bros. released a spoof of the Hatfield–McCoy feud titled Hillbilly Hare, featuring Bugs Bunny interacting with members of the "Martin family", obviously a reference to a family in the other famous Kentucky feud, the Rowan County War who had been feuding with the "Coy family". When Bugs Bunny is asked, "Be y'all a Martin or be y'all a Coy rabbit?", Bugs answers, "Well, my friends say I'm very coy!" and laughs. The Martin brothers chase Bugs for the rest of the short and are outwitted by him at every turn.

The 1951 Abbott and Costello feature Comin' Round the Mountain features a feud between the Winfields and McCoys.

A 1960 Woody Woodpecker cartoon "Ozark Lark", directed by Paul J. Smith, shows Woody riling up "the Last Martin" by wandering into "Coy's Cabin" and accidentally shooting Marin with the last Coy's shotgun.

The 1968 Merrie Melodies cartoon "Feud with a Dude" has the character Merlin the Magic Mouse trying to make peace with the two families, only to end up as the new target. This short has Hatfield claiming McCoy stole his hen, while McCoy claims Hatfield stole his pig

The 2007 movie Pumpkinhead: Blood Feud portrays the feud between the Hatfields and McCoys, but the circumstances of the feud are different.

In 2012, Lionsgate Films released a direct-to-DVD film titled Hatfields & McCoys: Bad Blood, starring Jeff Fahey, Perry King, and Christian Slater. This was another thinly disguised fictional version of the conflict.

=== Literature ===
Members of the Hatfield clan appear in Manly Wade Wellman's 1957 short story Old Devlins Was A-Waiting alongside fictional great-grandchildren of both the Hatfields and McCoys.

The Lucky Luke adventure Les Rivaux de Painful Gulch ("The Rivals of Painful Gulch") from 1962 was inspired by the Hatfield–McCoy feud.

In Kurt Vonnegut's 1976 novel Slapstick, a frontiersman dressed like "Davy Crockett" kills a man charged with conveying a message to the former president of the United States because he mistakes him for Newton McCoy. When the frontiersman is asked his name, he replies "Byron Hatfield".

Ann Rinaldi authored a 2002 historical novel titled The Coffin Quilt, based on a fictionalized account of the feud.

=== Television ===
The 1960 episode of The Andy Griffith Show titled "A Feud is a Feud" has a Wakefield and a Carter trying to prevent Andy, in his role as Justice of the Peace, from marrying two young lovers on opposite sides of the feud.

In the Bonanza episode "The Gunmen" (season 1, episode 19; aired January 23, 1960) Joe and Hoss were mistaken for two gunmen called Sladeboys that were hired by McFadden (McCoy) to take out the Hatfields in the small Texas town of Kiowa Flats.

In the story arc "Missouri Mish Mash" in season 3 of The Adventures of Rocky and Bullwinkle and Friends (1961–62), the heroes are drawn into the feud between the "Hatfuls" and the "Floys", unaware that both sides are secretly controlled by their nemesis Boris Badenov.

Hanna-Barbera's animated series The Flintstones featured a feud between the Hatrocks and the Flintstones in the episode "The Flintstone Hillbillies" (aired January 16, 1964), which was loosely based upon the Hatfield–McCoy feud. They later returned in "The Hatrocks and the Gruesomes" (aired January 22, 1965), where they visit Fred and are shown to dislike bug music. The Hatrock family consists of Jethro Hatrock, Gravella Hatrock, Zack Hatrock, Slab Hatrock, Granny Hatrock, Benji Hatrock, and their dogasaurus Percy.

The Hillbilly Bears, another Hanna-Barbera series of cartoons, formed a segment on The Atom Ant/Secret Squirrel Show (1965–1967). It featured a low-energy feud between the Ruggs and the Hoppers, which largely consisted of the two patriarchs firing the same bullet back and forth at each other from their porches.

The Ghost of Witch McCoy appears as the main villain in The Scooby-Doo Show episode "The Ozark Witch Switch". When a fictional member of the McCoy family is hanged for witchcraft, she exacts her vengeance by turning the Hatfields into frogs.

A 1975 television movie titled The Hatfields and the McCoys told a fictionalized version of the story. It starred Jack Palance as "Devil Anse" Hatfield and Steve Forrest as "Randall" McCoy.

The Time Squad episode "Feud For Thought" involves the Time Squad going back to the time of the Hatfields and the McCoys, where they find that the McCoys are being peaceful rather than fighting. This poses a threat to established history, leading the titular team to try and restore the feud.

A fifth-season episode of The West Wing has the communications director describe the feud between Israelis and Palestinians as "Hatfield and McCoy".

The second-season episode Vanished of NCIS takes place in a rural valley in Virginia, the two sides of which are feuding in a manner that Leroy Jethro Gibbs compares to the Hatfields and McCoys.

From May 28–30, 2012, U.S. television network The History Channel aired a three-part miniseries titled Hatfields & McCoys, starring Kevin Costner as William Anderson "Devil Anse" Hatfield and co-starring Bill Paxton as Randolph "Ole Ran'l" McCoy, Tom Berenger as Jim Vance, and Powers Boothe as Judge Valentine "Wall" Hatfield. The miniseries set the record as the most-watched entertainment telecast in the history of advertising-supported basic cable.

A pair of rifles owned by the Hatfields and the McCoys appeared as a pair of artifacts in the fourth season of the Syfy original show Warehouse 13. Within the show, the rifles have the ability to attract each other like magnets, but open fire when they get close enough to each other.

On August 1, 2013, the reality television series Hatfields & McCoys: White Lightning premiered on the History Channel. The series begins with an investor offering to set up the feuding families in business making moonshine, and follows the families' attempt to run the business together.

In an episode of Modern Family originally aired January 15, 2014, titled "Under Pressure," Cam is working as a gym teacher who has plans to let parents play dodgeball with each other at the school's open house, and wants to divide the two teams into Hatfields and McCoys. The school principal frowns upon this idea; however, Gloria and a competitive mother decide to settle their score with such a game. Hurriedly, Cam proclaims Hatfields for one side and McCoys for the other.

In episode 9 of the fourth season of the Chilean series 31 minutos, called "Westland", in the middle of the episode, Tulio sees an "Oestelandia" between the Hatfields and the McCoys, where the origin of the conflict is that one of the members of the Hatfields had stolen Grandma McCoy's potty. Near the end of the episode, they manage to end the conflict, and in the credits both families play their instrumental version of the show together.

The fifth season of My Little Pony: Friendship Is Magic featured an episode titled "The Hooffields and McColts", in which two clans have a longstanding feud over whether to use land for farming or construction. A similar theme was covered in the Littlest Pet Shop episode "Feud for Thought", in which two koalas are at odds with each other but do not know why, other than that their owners are in a feud.

The Ben 10 episode "Them's Fighting Words!" features a parody of the feud involving the Hartfields and the McJoys.

In the 16th episode of the 12th season of Family Guy, "Herpe the Love Sore", the Hatfield–McCoy feud is briefly referenced in the History Channel's fictional show, The Guy Who Lived in-Between the Hatfields and the McCoys.

=== Music ===
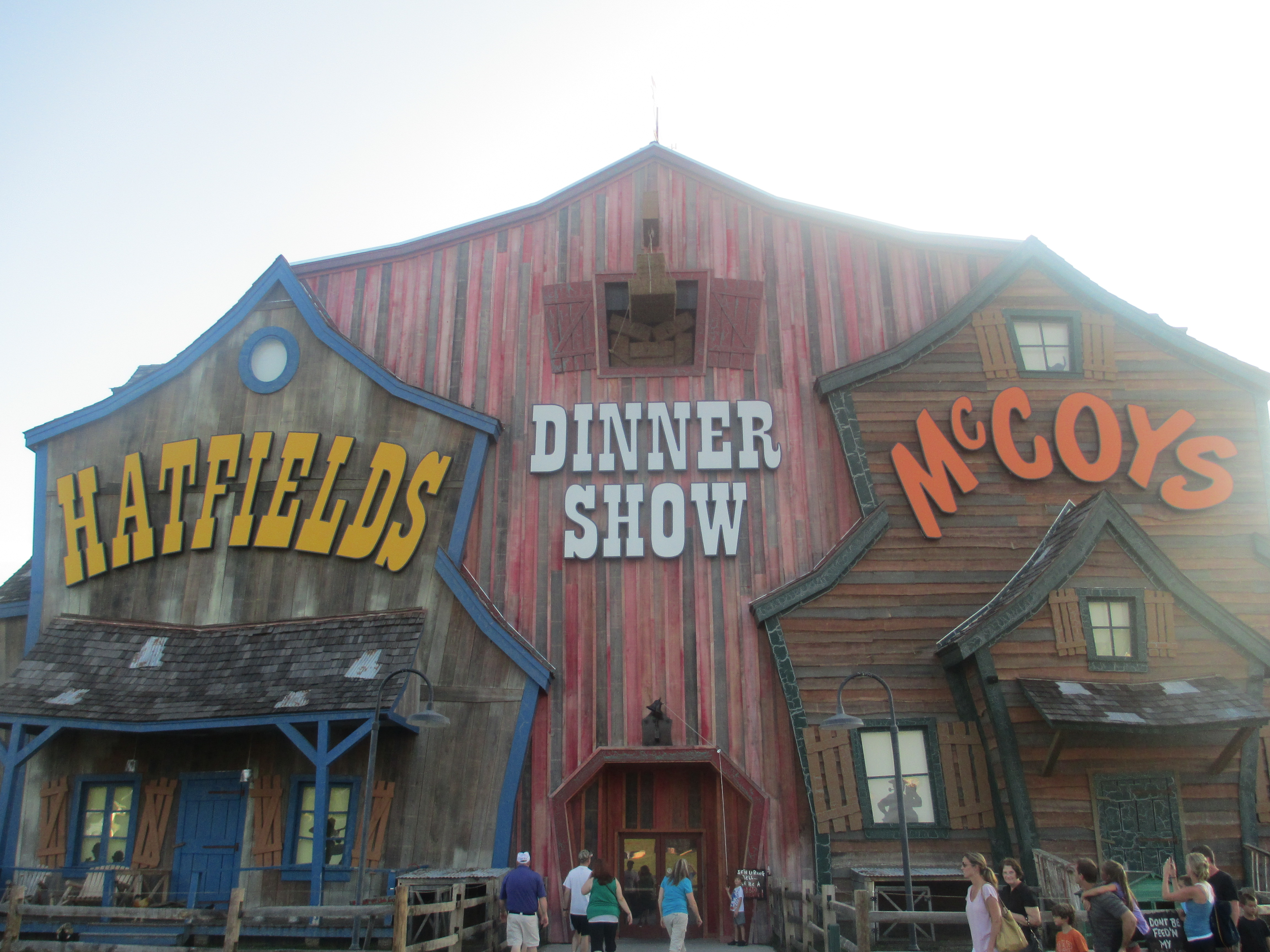
The Hatfield–McCoy feud is featured in a musical comedy dinner show in Pigeon Forge, Tennessee.

Waylon Jennings' 1977 song "Luckenbach Texas (Back To The Basics Of Love)" includes the reference "... this successful life we're livin', got us feudin' like the Hatfields and McCoys"

Ice Cube's 1991 song "My Summer Vacation" includes a reference: "Feudin', like the Hatfields and McCoys"

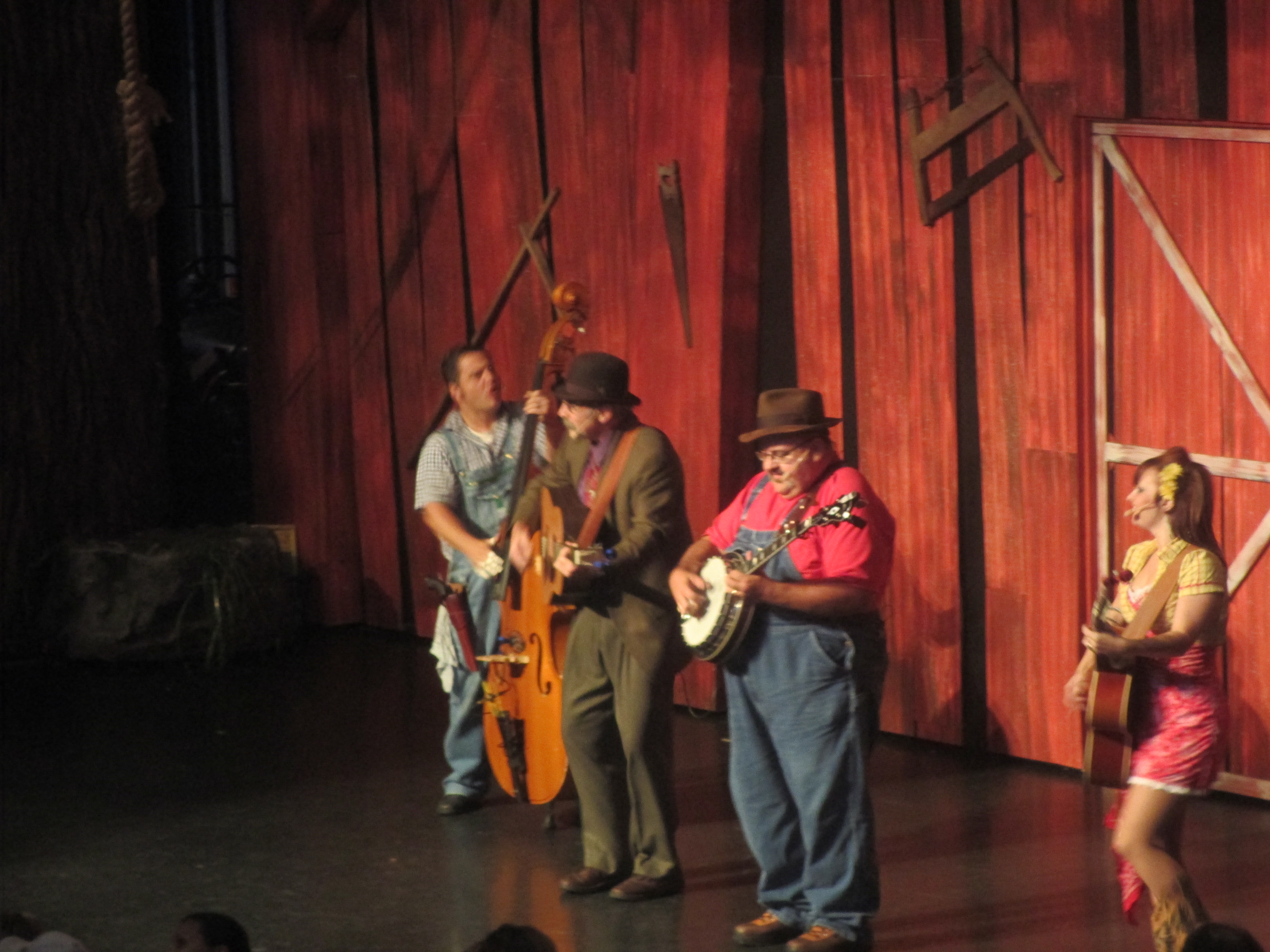
Hatfield–McCoy production (July 2012)

In the song "Black Cowboys" from Jeru the Damaja's 1996 album "Wrath of the Math", he includes a reference: "We shoot sh*t up like the Hatfields and McCoys".

In 2018, Mountain Fever Records released a single by Dave Adkins, "Blood Feud", from the album Right or Wrong. Written by Dave Adkins and Larry Cordle, it is a retelling of the familiar story of the deadly discord between the Hatfield and McCoy families during the Civil War era.

=== Theater ===
A dinner show based on the rivalry has been performed year-round in Pigeon Forge, Tennessee since 2010.

In 2006, The House Theatre of Chicago debuted a Romeo and Juliet-inspired dramatization of the feud, called Hatfield and McCoy. The company staged another production of this play in 2018 at the Chopin Theatre.

=== Video games ===
In the 2011 action-platformer video game Cactus McCoy and the Curse of Thorns by Flipline Studios, the protagonist Cactus McCoy and the main antagonist Hex Hatfield are named after the Hatfield–McCoy feud.

== Hatfield genealogy ==
=== Joseph Hatfield ===
Joseph Hatfield was a husbandman who came to Virginia from Leicestershire. At age 19, he went to the colony of Jamestown in 1619 on the ship Bona Nova. Records also show he was a resident at Jamestown in 1626.

He lived in Elizabeth City in 1633. On October 31 of that year, he obtained a 21-year lease. The lease was for 50 acres of land located on the east side of the Hampton River.

He has been listed as one of the first pioneers of Virginia. He is also the earliest identifiable American settler and ancestor to the Hatfield family.

=== Andrew Hatfield ===
Andrew Hatfield was an American Revolutionary War Captain who built Hatfield's fort along New River. He was born around 1730 in England. He was a descendant of Joseph Hatfield thus making him related to the feuding Hatfields. He may have been the uncle to Eph-of-All Hatfield and possibly the brother to private Joseph Hatfield. It is not known when he came to America.

Records show that Andrew Hatfield lived in Botetourt County, Virginia in 1770. He built Hatfield's fort along New River. The fort resided on what is now Giles County upon a farm that belonged to David J.L. Snidow. The fort was built either before 1770 or around 1774. Thomas Burke (1741–1808), a captain from the Indian wars at one point was in charge of the fort.

The Bromfield family would also settle along the New River. In 1776, one Bromfield and a member of Andrew's family went to the same mineral lick; they mistook each other for a bear, and one of them was shot dead. This resulted in conflict between the 2 families.

Andrew fought during the Battle of Point Pleasant. His name is found on James Robertson's 1777 list of people who swore allegiance to the states.

In 1804, he moved to what is today Cabell County, West Virginia. He would eventually move there along with his 4 sons. He lived at Mather's farm until his death. He is buried in Hatfield cemetery Inez, West Virginia.

The area where the fort stood would later become known as Hatfield Voting Precinct.

=== Abner Vance ===
Abner Vance (1760 or 1770 – July 16, 1819) was an American Revolutionary War veteran and murderer. He was also reportedly a preacher. He reportedly killed a man in 1817 and fled to Tug Fork. A few years later he was hanged for murder.

After he was hanged a folk song was made about him. The murder and subsequent execution is considered a founding an event for the Vances' settlement in Tug Fork Valley. Many of his descendants would be involved in the Hatfield-McCoy Feud. He is an ancestor of Vice President JD Vance.

=== Private Joseph Hatfield ===
Joseph Hatfield was a frontier scout and Indian fighter. Dean King called Joseph "one of the ablest scouts and woodsmen on the western frontier".

Accord to Dr Hatfield, Joseph Hatfield is the son of Abraham Hatfield Jr and Margaret Winans. While according to Harry Leon Sellards Jr, Joseph is the son of George Goff Hatfield.He was a veteran that served in the Battle of Pointe Pleasant.

Joseph Hatfield was born around 1740. He would die August, 1832.

Joseph married Elizabeth Smith giving birth to the following children:

- George (birth not mentioned)
- Andrew Hatfield
- Ely (Eli) Hatfield (born around 1788 and died 1850)

Joseph Hatfield would have a second wife named Rachael Smith (born around 1753 and died May 19, 1855). The couple would produce the following children:

- William
- Periba
- Sarah
- Joseph Jr (born 1787)

Daughters of the American revolution states there is no evidence that his first wife was Elizabeth Smith.

Private Joseph Hatfield was the father the of Ephraim (Eph-of-All) Hatfield.

=== Devil Anse Hatfield family tree ===
Names in red indicate those who were killed as a direct result of the feud.
Names in orange highlight intermarriages between Hatfield and McCoy.

Devil Anse Hatfield family tree

with Mary	with Anna
Ephraim b. c1765 m. Mary Smith Goff m. Anna M. Musick Bundy
Valentine b. 1789 m. Martha Weddington	George b. 1804 m. Nancy Whitk	Jeremiah b. 1805 m. Rachel Vance
Ephraim (Big Eaf) b. 1811 m. Nancy Vance (sister of Jim Vance)	Anderson (Preacher) b. 1835 m. Polly Runyan	Basil (Deacon) b. 1839 m. Nancy Lowe	Elias (Bad 'Lias) b. 1853 m. Jane Chafin	Floyd b. 1858 m. Anne Pinson m. Jenny Hunt	Ephraim b. 1838 m. Elizabeth McCoy	Jacob b. 1843/45 m. Rebecca Crabtree
Valentine (Uncle Wall) b. 1834 m. Jane Maynard	Martha b. 1838	Anderson (Devil Anse) b. 1839 m. Levicy Chafin	*Ellison b. c1842 m. Sarah Staton	Elias (Good 'Lias) b. 1848 m. Elizabeth Chafin	William Sidney (Two-Gun Sid) b. 1891/93 m. Jessie Lee Testerman (née Maynard)
Levicy b. 1862 m. Plyant Mahon	Ellison Mounts	Dr. Henry D. b. 1875 m. South Carolina Bronson
Johnson (Johnse) b. 1862 m. Nancy McCoy m. Rebecca Browning m. Roxie Browning m. Nettie Toler	William Anderson (Cap) b. 1864 m. Nancy Glenn	Robert E. Lee b. 1867 m. Mariah Wolford	Nancy b. 1869 m. John Vance m. Charlie Mullens	Elliott Rutherford b. 1872 m. Margaret Shindler	Mary b. 1873 m. Frank Howes	Elizabeth b. 1875 m. John Caldwell	Elias b. 1878 m. Peggy Simple	Detroit (Troy) b. 1881 m. Pearl	Joseph b. 1883 m. Grace Ferrell	Rosada b. 1885 m. Marion Browning	Willis Wilson b. 1888 m. Lakie Maynor m. Ida Chafin	Tennyson (Tennis) b. 1890 m. Lettie Hunter m. Sadie Walters m. Margaret

== McCoy genealogy ==
=== Randolph McCoy family tree ===
Names in red indicate those who were killed as a direct result of the feud.
Names in orange highlight intermarriages between Hatfield and McCoy.

Randolph McCoy family tree

William McCoy b. c1750 m. Cordelia Campbell
Samuel b. c1782 m. Elizabeth (Davis?)	John b. 1788 m. Margaret Jackson	Daniel b. 1790 m. Margaret Taylor
Asa b. c1810 m. Eleanor Burress	William b. c1811 m. Mary Buress	Allen b. c1823 m. Betty Blankenship	Sarah "Sally" b. 1829 m. 1st cousin Randolph	Nancy b. c1809 m. Wm Staton	Randolph b. 1825 m. 1st cousin Sarah "Sally"	*Asa Harmon b. c1828 m. Martha Kline
Selkirk b. c1830 m.Louisa Williamson	Elizabeth b. c1838 m. Ephraim Hatfield	Sarah b. c1844 m. *Ellison Hatfield	*William Staton b. c1852	Mary M b. 1851 m. Bill Daniels	Jacob b. 1853 m. Elizabeth Vance m. Ruth Christian	Larkin b. 1856-d.1937 m. Mary Coleman.	*Louis Jefferson (Jeff) b. 1859-d.1886	Asa H (Bud) b. c1862	Nancy b. c1865 m. Johnse Hatfield m. Frank Phillips
Lorenzo Dow b. c1852 m. Phoebe	Elliott Hatfield; 1866–1939 m.Mathilda Christian (parents of America Hatfield, who m. Frank McCoy)	Frank McCoy; 1889–1969 m. America Hatfield; 1893–1960 (granddaughter of *Ellison Hatfield)
Josephine b. c1850	James H. (Uncle Jim) b. c1851 m. Malissa Smith	Floyd b. 1853 m. Mary Rutherford	*Tolbert b. 1854 m. Mary Butcher	Samuel b. 1855 m. Martha Jackson	Lilburn b. c1856	Mary Katherine b. 1857	*Alifair b. 1858	Roseanna b. 1859-d.1888	Calvin b. c1862	*Pharmer b. c1863	*Randolph Jr. b. c1864	William b. c1866	Trinvilla b. c1868 m. William Thompson	Adelaide b. 1870	Fanny b. 1873 m. Roland Charles

== See also ==
- Family feuds in the United States
- Jones–Liddell feud
- Narcissism of small differences
