= Randolph McCoy =

Patriarch of feuding family (1825–1914)

Randall McCoy
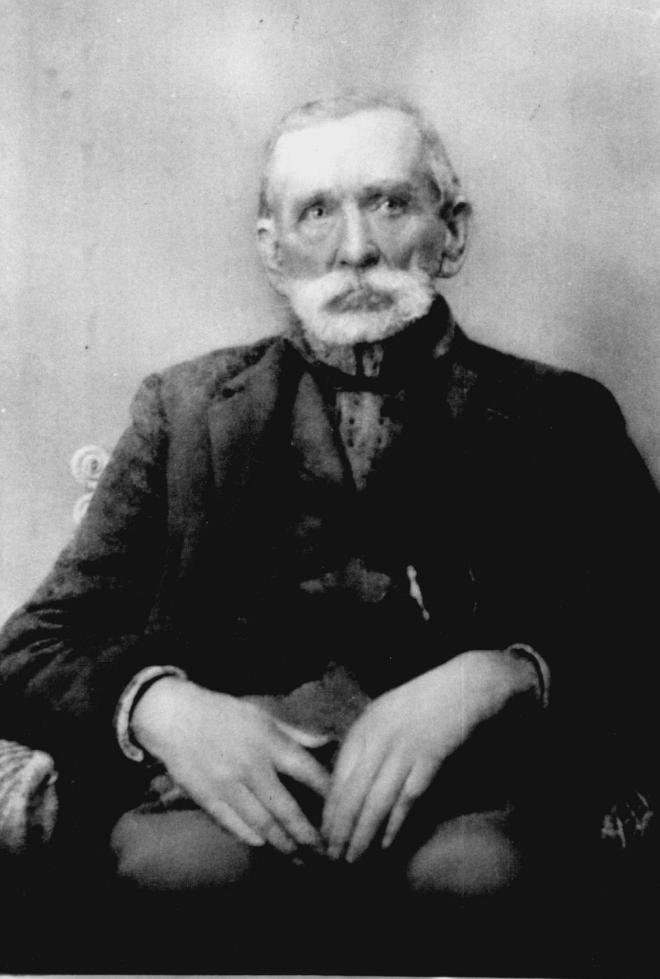
- Born: Randolph McCoy; October 30, 1825; Tug River Valley, Kentucky, US
- Died: March 28, 1914 (aged 88); Pikeville, Kentucky, US
- Resting place: Dils Cemetery, Pikeville, Kentucky
- Occupations: Farmer and ferry operator
- Known for: Hatfield–McCoy feud
- Spouse: Sarah McCoy (m. 1849–1890s)
- Children: 16
- Military career
- Allegiance: Confederate States of America
- Branch: Confederate States Army
- Service years: 1861–1865
- Rank: Private
- Unit: 45th Virginia Battalion Infantry
- Conflicts: American Civil War

Randolph "Randall" or "Ol' Randall" McCoy (October 30, 1825 – March 28, 1914) was an American farmer who was the patriarch of the McCoy family involved in the infamous Hatfield–McCoy feud. He was the fourth of thirteen children born to Daniel McCoy and Margaret Taylor McCoy and lived mostly on the Kentucky side of Tug Fork, a tributary of the Big Sandy River. He previously served in the Confederate States Army during the American Civil War.

During the almost thirty-year feud with the Hatfield clan under their patriarch Devil Anse Hatfield, Randolph would lose five of his children to the violence.

== Marriage, family, and children ==
Randolph McCoy married his first cousin, Sarah "Sally" McCoy, daughter of Samuel McCoy and Elizabeth Davis, on December 9, 1849, in Pike County, Kentucky. They were of Scottish descent and had 16 children together.

Their children were:

Name	Nickname	Lifespan	Son/Daughter	Notes
Josephine McCoy	Josie, Vina	1848–	daughter	she died after 1910 census
James McCoy	Jim, uncle Jim	1849–1929	son	died after the feud
Floyd McCoy		1852–1928	son	died after the feud
Tolbert McCoy		1853–1882	son	killed during the feud, executed by the Hatfields for murdering Ellison Hatfield Sr.
Lilburn McCoy	Lebord	1854–?	son	Fate unknown after 1870 census.
Samuel McCoy II	Sam	1855–1921	son	died after the feud
Infant		1857–1857	daughter	died as an infant
Alifair McCoy		1858–1888	daughter	killed during the feud, murdered by "Cotton Top" Ellison Hatfield Jr during an assault on the McCoy farm
Roseanna McCoy		1859–1889	daughter	died during the feud due to illness (Tuberculosis), died young
Calvin McCoy	Cal	1862–1888	son	killed during the feud murdered by Johnson "Johnse" Hatfield or Cap Hatfield during an assault on the McCoy farm
Pharmer McCoy		1863–1882	son	killed during the feud executed by the Hatfields for murdering Ellison Hatfield Sr.
Randolph McCoy	Bud	1864–1882	son	killed during the feud executed by the Hatfields for murdering Ellison Hatfield Sr.
William McCoy	Bill	1866–?	son	Fate unknown after 1880 census
Trinvilla or Twinvilla McCoy	Trinnie	1868–1893	daughter	Died young
Adelaide McCoy		1870–1898	daughter	died young
Fannie McCoy		1873–1943	daughter	died after the feud

Their most prominent child was Roseanna McCoy, most known for her relationship with Johnse Hatfield, with whom she had a daughter, Sarah Elizabeth (named for her Grandmother and Great-Grandmother). Johnse Hatfield later married Nancy McCoy, a cousin of Roseanna.

Samuel McCoy (1782–1855) and Daniel McCoy (1790–1885) were sons of "Old" William McCoy (April 1751 – 1822) and according to 111 Y-DNA results, likely nephews of Richard McCoy (abt. 1752–1792) of New River area, Montgomery County, Virginia.

Samuel McCoy's sons included:

- John McCoy (b. abt. 1806), married Margaret "Peggy" Burress (b. abt. 1815);
- Asa Harmon McCoy (1809–1884), married Eleanor "Nellie" Burress (1808–abt. 1879), whose son Selkirk McCoy (1833–1908) married Louisa Maynard; and
- William McCoy (b. abt. 1811), married Mary A. Burress (b. abt. 1821), whose daughter Elizabeth McCoy (b. abt. 1838) married Ephram Hatfield.

As noted above, Samuel McCoy's daughter Sarah "Sally" McCoy (1829–1890) married Randolph McCoy (1825–1914), son of her uncle Daniel McCoy.

The 3 Burress women were daughters of Micajah Burress (1775–1850) and a Rachel McCoy, who married on October 15, 1795, in Montgomery County, Virginia. This Rachel was either the daughter of Richard McCoy (abt. 1752–1792) and Susanna Moore (1755–1830) of New River area, Montgomery County, Virginia, or she was another Rachel McCoy. Another daughter of Richard McCoy and Susanna Moore, Nancy McCoy (b. abt. 1782), married Thomas Jefferson McColley (1780–1842) in Montgomery County, Virginia on June 7, 1803. "Old" William McCoy's daughter Nancy has erroneously been linked as married to Thomas Jefferson McColley. It is believed William Harmon McCoy, son of Richard McCoy and brother of Nancy McCoy (m. Thomas Jefferson McColley) is the "William" that signed Nancy's marriage bond since her father Richard, predeceased her marriage to McColley. The fact that "Old" William's daughter Nancy McCoy (b. abt. 1784–d. bef. 1823) married Thomas McColley is disproven is documented in the 1842 Will of Thomas Jefferson McColley who lists his "living" wife Nancy. Nancy McCoy, daughter of "Old" William died in 1823.

Richard McCoy and Susanna Moore of New River area, Virginia, also had a son William Harmon McCoy (1780–1855). Richard's son William was the first of known record to have the name "Harmon" which subsequently was given to 2 of "Old" William's grandsons: Asa Harmon McCoy (1809–1884), son of Samuel McCoy and to Asa Harmon McCoy (1828–1865), son of Daniel – both Samuel and Daniel were sons of "Old" William McCoy.

Perry Cline and wife Elizabeth Riffe were parents of Sarah Ann Cline (1785–1865) born in Montgomery County, Virginia, and Jacob "Rich Jake" Cline (1790–1858), also born in Montgomery County, Virginia. Sarah Cline alleged that she had a child out of wedlock in 1803 with George H. McCoy (1784–1870), son of Richard McCoy and Susanna Moore of New River area Montgomery County, Virginia. George H. McCoy married Martha "Patsy" A. Kirk about 1805.

"Rich Jake" Cline and Nancy Fuller were parents of:

- Perry A. Cline (1849–1891), who married Martha Adkins; and
- Martha "Patty" Cline (1828–1907), who married Asa Harmon McCoy, son of Daniel McCoy.

== Feud ==
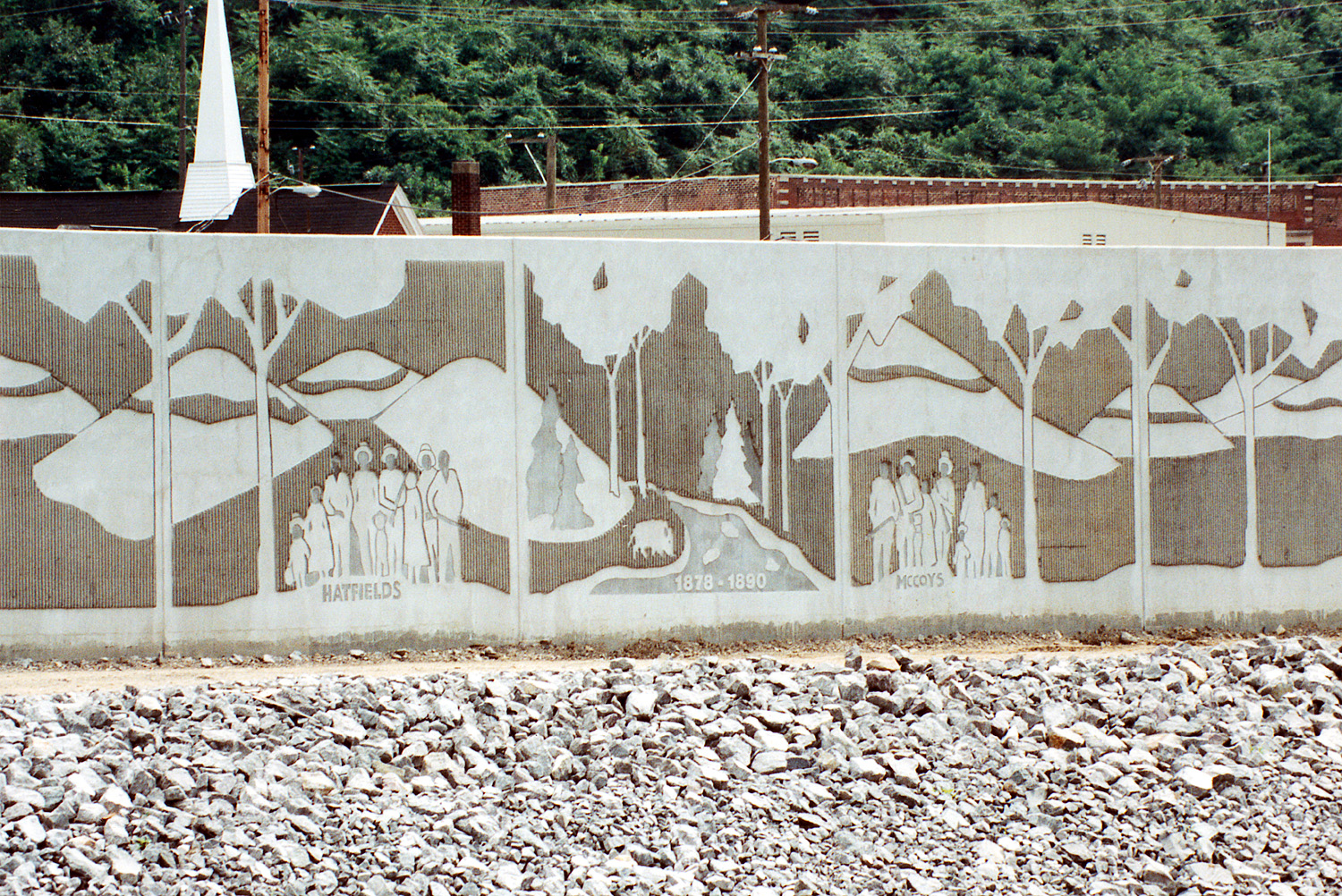
A section of the floodwall along the Tug Fork in Matewan, West Virginia, constructed by the U.S. Army Corps of Engineers, depicts the Hatfield–McCoy feud.

During the American Civil War, the feud leaders from both families were staunchly pro-Confederate, and Randolph himself served in the 45th Virginia Infantry Battalion Confederate Army during the opening years of the war and was a POW from 1863 to 1865. He later returned to Kentucky. However, Randolph's younger brother, Asa Harmon McCoy, enlisted in the Union Army as "Asa H McCay" in Co E of the 45th Kentucky Infantry USA. He was discharged from the Union Army on December 24, 1864, after suffering a broken leg, and returned home. Soon after his return, Jim Vance, uncle of Devil Anse Hatfield, and a member of the "Logan Wildcats" militia put Asa Harmon on notice that they (the Wildcats) would soon be paying him, "a visit." Asa Harmon McCoy tried to escape by hiding out in a local cave, but was tracked to his hideout and killed. No charges were ever filed but it was widely known that Vance and members of Hatfield's Wildcats were directly responsible for his death.

In the late 1870s, Devil Anse Hatfield was involved in a land dispute with Randolph McCoy's cousin, Perry Cline, over a 5,000-acre tract of land that both held title to. Hatfield eventually brought a civil suit against Cline. Hatfield won in what was seen by the McCoys as a Hatfield-friendly court.

In the fall of 1878, Randolph "Randall" McCoy brought charges against Floyd Hatfield for stealing one of his hogs. This allegation was a very serious offense at the time, as hogs were extremely valuable to the farming economy. Due to the statements made by Bill Staton, who was related to both families, the case was decided in favor of the Hatfields. The ruling further inflamed the feud, as Randolph McCoy viewed the outcome as unfair. Later, brothers Sam and Paris McCoy were accused, tried, and acquitted of the death of Staton when the judge ruled Staton's death an act of self-defense by the McCoy brothers.

Randall's daughter Roseanna McCoy romanced "Johnse" Hatfield and later became pregnant with Johnse's child. Upon learning of the affair, Randolph became extremely upset and disowned her. Roseanna, unwanted by both families, moved in with her uncle Uriah and "Aunt Betty" Elizabeth (Rutherford) McCoy. Johnse later married Roseanna's cousin, Nancy McCoy. Roseanna's baby died before her first birthday and the abandoned Roseanna died at the age of 29.

The peak of the feuding occurred when three of Randolph's sons (Roseanna's brothers) killed Ellison Hatfield, brother of Devil Anse, on election day in 1882. Devil Anse retaliated for the killing of his brother by executing, without trial, Tolbert (b. 1854), Pharmer (b. 1863) and Randolph Jr. (b. 1864), three sons of Randolph McCoy near present-day Matewan, West Virginia.

On January 1, 1888, "Cap" Hatfield and Jim Vance led several members of the Hatfield family to attack the McCoy cabin. Randolph's house was burned to the ground and numerous family members were slain by the Hatfields, including two of Randolph's children. His son Calvin was killed in the shootout as was his daughter, Alifair, who was shot to death as she tried to flee the burning house. Randolph's wife Sally was badly injured when she attempted to comfort Alifair, suffering several broken ribs and skull fractures. She survived the beating but was disabled for the rest of her life. She died in a hospital of a stroke on October 14, 1890, at the age of 61. With his house burning, Randolph and his remaining family members were able to escape to the woods; unfortunately, his children, unprepared for the elements, suffered frostbite. He moved his family to Pikeville, Kentucky, where he lived out the remainder of his life in bitterness and grieving. He operated a ferry in Pikeville for some time, and the home he lived in still stands at the intersection of Main Street and Scott Avenue. By the end of the feud, he had lost seven of his children and his wife.

Shortly after the New Year's massacre, Kentucky deputy Frank Phillips and a posse of McCoys chased down Jim Vance and Cap Hatfield, killing Vance. Phillips' posse rounded up nine Hatfield family members and supporters and hauled them off to jail.

== Death ==
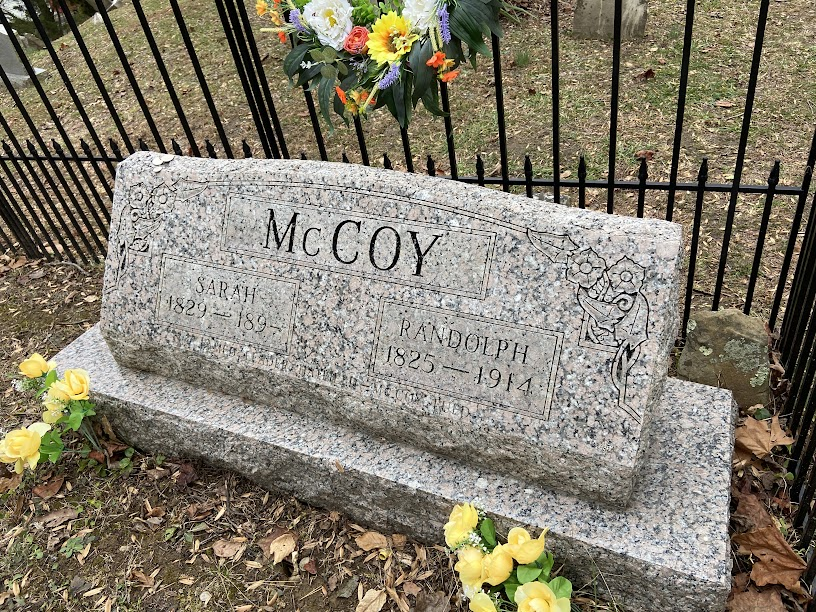
Randolph and Sarah McCoy headstone

Randolph McCoy died from dementia at the age of 88. This was 2 months after he was severely burned after falling into a cooking fire at his grandson, Melvin's house on January 9. He is buried in the Dils Cemetery in Pikeville, next to his wife.

== Conclusion ==
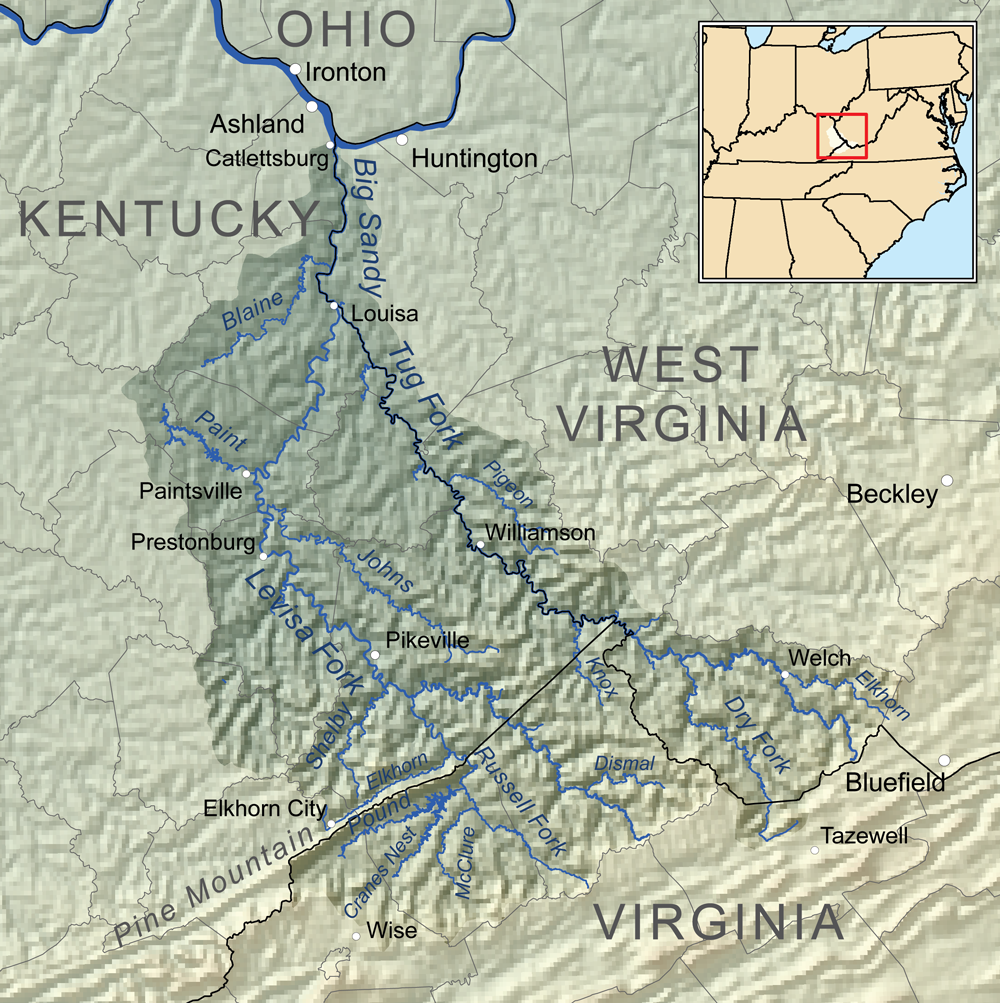
Hatfield–McCoy feud site along the Tug Fork tributary (right) in the Big Sandy River watershed

In 1888, Wall Hatfield and eight others were arrested by a posse led by Frank Phillips and brought to Kentucky to stand trial for the murder of Alifair McCoy, who was killed during the New Year's Massacre.

The feuding and warfare brought in political leaders of Kentucky and West Virginia. The governor of West Virginia, E. Willis Wilson, accused Kentucky of violating the extradition process and appealed the matter to the Supreme Court of the United States. Kentucky Governor Simon Bolivar Buckner sent his Adjutant General to Pike County to investigate the situation. In May 1889, the Supreme Court decided against West Virginia (Mahon v. Justice); the nine Hatfields would be tried in Pikeville. Private detectives hunted down many Hatfields, though Devil Anse was never tried nor jailed. In 1890, Ellison Mounts was executed in Kentucky for his part in the McCoy killings. He was one of the men captured along with Mahon. The feud started to wind down with Mounts' execution.

On June 14, 2003, the McCoy cousins partnered with Reo Hatfield of Waynesboro, Virginia, to author an official truce between the families. The idea was symbolic: to show that Americans could bury their differences and unite in times of crisis.
