= Garry Delaney =

English boxer

Gary Delaney
Personal information
- Nationality: English
- Born: 12 August 1970 (age 56) Newham, England
- Height: 6 ft 3 in (1.91 m)
- Weight: Light Heavyweight; Cruiserweight; Heavyweight

Boxing career
- Stance: Orthodox

Boxing record
- Total fights: 45
- Wins: 31
- Losses: 13
- Draws: 1

Gary Delaney (born 12 August 1970) is an English professional boxer of the 1990s and 2000s. He won the British Boxing Board of Control (BBBofC) Southern Area light heavyweight title, World Boxing Board (WBB) light heavyweight title, World Boxing Organization (WBO) Inter-Continental light heavyweight title, BBBofC Southern Area cruiserweight title, and Commonwealth light heavyweight title (twice), and was a challenger for the BBBofC British heavyweight title, and Commonwealth heavyweight title against Julius Francis, World Boxing Organization (WBO) Inter-Continental cruiserweight title against John Keeton, and Jesper Kristiansen, BBBofC British cruiserweight title, and Commonwealth (British Empire) cruiserweight title against Bruce Scott, and World Boxing Union cruiserweight title against Sebastiaan Rothmann, and Enzo Maccarinelli, his professional fighting weight varied from light heavyweight to heavyweight.

== Murder conviction ==
On 27 July 2006 Garry Delaney was convicted of murder, and was later sentenced to serve a minimum of 11 years in jail, following the death of Paul Price in October 2005 in a bar in which Delaney was working as a bouncer, after an altercation, Delaney punched Price who fell to the ground, Price's head hit the ground, fracturing his skull, but despite surgery he later died.

== Genealogical information ==
Garry Delaney is the older brother of the boxer Mark Delaney.

== Professional boxing record ==
45 fights	31 wins	13 losses
By knockout	17	6
By decision	14	7
Draws	1	
No contests	0	

No.	Result	Record	Opponent	Type	Round, time	Date	Age	Location	Notes
45	Loss	31–13–1	(United Kingdom) Micky Steeds	PTS	6	Jul 24, 2005	(United Kingdom) Equinox Nightclub, Leicester, England		
44	Loss	31–12–1	(Ukraine) Alex Mazikin	UD	4	May 10, 2005	Pueblo Espanol, Mallorca, Spain		
43	Loss	31–11–1	(Belarus) Valery Chechenev	UD	6	Apr 19, 2005	Hermann-Wielandner-Halle, Bischofshofen, Austria		
42	Loss	31–10–1	(United Kingdom) David Haye	RTD	3 (6), 3:00	Jan 21, 2005	(United Kingdom) Fountain Leisure Centre, London, England		
41	Loss	31–9–1	(Ukraine) Kostyantyn Pryziuk	PTS	6	Dec 11, 2004	Madrid, Spain		
40	Loss	31–8–1	(Denmark) Steffen Nielsen	UD	6	Nov 12, 2004	Brøndbyhallen, Brøndby, Denmark		
39	Loss	31–7–1	(United Kingdom) Enzo Maccarinelli	TKO	8 (12), 2:37	Feb 21, 2004	(United Kingdom) National Ice Rink, Cardiff, Wales	For WBU Cruiserweight title.	
38	Win	31–6–1	(United Kingdom) Paul Bonson	PTS	6	Sep 26, 2003	(United Kingdom) Rivermead Leisure Centre, Reading, Berkshire, England		
37	Win	30–6–1	(South Africa) Sebastiaan Rothmann	UD	12	Mar 2, 2002	Carnival City, Brakpan, South Africa	For WBU Cruiserweight title.	
36	Win	30–5–1	(United Kingdom) Tony Dowling	TKO	6 (10), 2:58	Oct 20, 2001	(United Kingdom) Kelvin Hall, Glasgow, Scotland		
35	Win	29–5–1	(United Kingdom) Chris Bacon	TKO	10 (10), 2:59	Jul 14, 2001	(United Kingdom) Olympia, Liverpool, England		
34	Win	28–5–1	(United Kingdom) Darren Ashton	RTD	4 (8), 3:00	Jun 15, 2001	(United Kingdom) Britannia Hotel, Millwall, England		
33	Loss	27–5–1	(Jamaica) Bruce Scott	RTD	3 (12), 3:00	Mar 10, 2001	(United Kingdom) York Hall, London, England	For BBBofC British Cruiserweight title. For Commonwealth (British Empire) Cruiserweight title.	
32	Win	27–4–1	(United Kingdom) Dominic Negus	PTS	10	Oct 6, 2000	(United Kingdom) Maidstone Leisure Centre, Maidstone, England	Won BBBofC Southern Area Cruiserweight title.	
31	Loss	26–4–1	(Denmark) Jesper Kristiansen	RTD	10 (12), 3:00	Apr 29, 2000	Varde Halle, Varde, Denmark	For vacant WBO Inter-Continental Cruiserweight title.	
30	Win	26–3–1	(United Kingdom) Lee Swaby	PTS	8	Sep 4, 1999	(United Kingdom) York Hall, London, England		
29	Win	25–3–1	(United Kingdom) Tim Brown	PTS	8	May 1, 1999	(United Kingdom) National Sports Centre, London, England		
28	Loss	24–3–1	(United Kingdom) John Keeton	SD	12	Jan 23, 1999	(United Kingdom) Grundy Park Leisure Centre, Cheshunt, England	For WBO Inter-Continental Cruiserweight title.	
27	Win	24–2–1	(United Kingdom) Darron Griffiths	PTS	6	Jun 5, 1998	(United Kingdom) Leisure & Tennis Centre, Southend-on-Sea, England		
26	Loss	23–2–1	(United Kingdom) Julius Francis	TKO	6 (12), 2:31	Sep 27, 1997	(United Kingdom) Ulster Hall, Belfast, Northern Ireland	For Commonwealth (British Empire) Heavyweight title. For BBBofC British Heavyweight title.	
25	Win	23–1–1	(Nigeria) Peter Oboh	DQ	8 (10)	Mar 4, 1997	(United Kingdom) Elephant & Castle Centre, London, England	Oboh disqualified for headbutts.	
24	Win	22–1–1	(United States) John Kiser	UD	6	Feb 7, 1997	(United States) Hilton Hotel, Las Vegas, Nevada, U.S.		
23	Win	21–1–1	(United Kingdom) Joey Paladino	TKO	1 (6)	Apr 9, 1996	(United Kingdom) Leisure Centre, Stevenage, England		
22	Win	20–1–1	(Uganda) Franco Wanyama	PTS	6	Feb 6, 1996	(United Kingdom) Festival Hall, Basildon, Essex, England		
21	Loss	19–1–1	(United Kingdom) Noel Magee	RTD	7 (12), 3:00	May 9, 1995	(United Kingdom) Festival Hall, Basildon, Essex, England	Lost Commonwealth (British Empire) Light heavyweight title. Delaney retired with an injured left hand.	
20	Win	19–0–1	(United States) Ernest Mateen	RTD	7 (12), 3:00	Mar 18, 1995	(Republic of Ireland) Green Glens Arena, Millstreet, Ireland	Won vacant WBO Inter-Continental Light heavyweight title.	
19	Win	18–0–1	(Zimbabwe) Arigoma Chiponda	PTS	12	Sep 30, 1994	(United Kingdom) York Hall, London, England	Won vacant Commonwealth (British Empire) Light heavyweight title.	
18	Win	17–0–1	(Argentina) Sergio Daniel Merani Arigoma Chiponda	PTS	12	Jul 9, 1994	(United Kingdom) Earls Court Exhibition Hall, London, England	Retained WBO Penta-Continental Light heavyweight title.	
17	Win	16–0–1	(United Kingdom) Simon Harris	KO	6 (10)	Apr 9, 1994	(United Kingdom) York Hall, London, England	Retained WBO Penta-Continental Light heavyweight title. Retained BBBofC Southern Area Light heavyweight title.	
16	Win	15–0–1	(South Africa) Jim Murray	TKO	7 (12)	Jan 11, 1994	(United Kingdom) York Hall, London, England	Retained WBO Penta-Continental Light heavyweight title.	
15	Win	14–0–1	(Guyana) Ray Alberts	TKO	3 (12)	Dec 21, 1993	(United Kingdom) Grosvenor House, London, England	Won vacant WBO Penta-Continental Light heavyweight title.	
14	Win	13–0–1	(United Kingdom) John Kaighin	KO	1 (8)	Nov 6, 1993	(United Kingdom) York Hall, London, England		
13	Win	12–0–1	(United Kingdom) Glazz Campbell	KO	6 (10)	Sep 28, 1993	(United Kingdom) York Hall, London, England	Won BBBofC Southern Area Light heavyweight title.	
12	Win	11–0–1	(United Kingdom) Simon Collins	PTS	8	Jan 30, 1993	(United Kingdom) Brentwood Centre, Brentwood, Essex, England		
11	Win	10–0–1	(United Kingdom) Simon McDougall	PTS	8	Dec 12, 1992	(United Kingdom) Alexandra Pavilion, London, England		
10	Win	9–0–1	(United Kingdom) John Oxenham	KO	5 (8)	Nov 10, 1992	(United Kingdom) Goresbrook Leisure Centre, London, England		
9	Win	8–0–1	(United Kingdom) Simon McDougall	PTS	8	Oct 6, 1992	Arenahal, Antwerp, Belgium		
8	Win	7–0–1	(United Kingdom) Gil Lewis	KO	2 (6)	Sep 15, 1992	(United Kingdom) National Sports Centre, London, England		
7	Win	6–0–1	(United Kingdom) Nigel Rafferty	KO	5 (6)	Jun 16, 1992	(United Kingdom) Goresbrook Leisure Centre, London, England		
6	Win	5–0–1	(United Kingdom) John Williams	PTS	6	May 12, 1992	(United Kingdom) National Sports Centre, London, England		
5	Draw	4–0–1	(United Kingdom) Simon Harris	PTS	8	Feb 11, 1992	(United Kingdom) Broadway Theatre, London, England		
4	Win	4–0	(United Kingdom) Randy B Powell	TKO	1 (6), 0:32	Dec 11, 1991	(United Kingdom) Festival Hall, Basildon, Essex, England		
3	Win	3–0	(United Kingdom) John Kaighin	PTS	6	Nov 13, 1991	(United Kingdom) York Hall, London, England		
2	Win	2–0	(Jamaica) Joe Frater	TKO	1 (6), 0:24	Oct 23, 1991	(United Kingdom) York Hall, London, England		
1	Win	1–0	(United Kingdom) Gus Mendes	TKO	1 (6), 0:30	Oct 2, 1991	(United Kingdom) Broadway Theatre, London, England		
