= Mark Hobson (boxer) =

British former professional boxer (born 1976)

Personal information
- Nickname: Hobbo
- Nationality: British
- Born: 7 May 1976 (age 50) Huddersfield, Yorkshire, England
- Height: 6 ft 5 in (196 cm)
- Weight: Cruiserweight

Boxing career
- Stance: Orthodox

Boxing record
- Total fights: 33
- Wins: 27
- Win by KO: 14
- Losses: 5
- Draws: 1

Mark Hobson (born 5 July 1976) is a British former professional boxer who competed from 1997 to 2007. He challenged once for the WBO cruiserweight title in 2006. At regional level, he held the Commonwealth cruiserweight title from 2003 to 2006 and the British cruiserweight title twice between 2003 and 2007.

== Early professional career ==
Hobson had his first professional contest on 9 June 1997, scoring a points win over Michael Pinnock in Bradford. For the first three and a half years of his career Hobson built up a respectable record of 14–1–1 with the only loss coming against Mark Levy in 1999. On 24 April 2001 Hobson challenged South African fighter Sebastiaan Rothmann at the Olympia in Liverpool for the WBU Cruiserweight title. The fight ended in a first stoppage defeat for Hobson after the fight was ended in the 9th round.

== British and Commonwealth champion ==
Following the Rothmann defeat, Hobson took on Germany's future WBA world champion Firat Arslan at the Barnsley Metrodome Arena and was again stopped, this time on cuts in the seventh round. Four wins, including one over Lee Swaby, followed however as Hobson positioned himself for a shot at the vacant Commonwealth cruiserweight belt on 25 January 2003 pitching himself against Ugandan Abdul Kadou and winning the contest with a fourth round stoppage. One further win followed before Hobson made the first defence of his title against Robert Norton in a fight which also had the vacant British belt on the line. The fight which took place at the Ponds Forge Arena in Sheffield on 5 September 2003 saw Hobson become a double champion with a 12-round points win.

Further defences of both titles followed with wins over Tony Moran on 13 March 2004, Lee Swaby on 27 May 2004 and former champion and world title challenger Bruce Scott on 17 December 2004. Hobson took a break from the ring in 2005 but went on to make one further defence of both his belts on 1 June 2006 against John Keeton back at the Metrodome in Barnsley.

== Further title wins and challenges ==
Following the win over Scott and his subsequent break from the ring, Hobson returned to action on 4 March 2006 to challenge Enzo Maccarinelli for the WBU cruiserweight title in a fight that was the chief support to Joe Calzaghe's destruction of Jeff Lacy at the MEN Arena in Manchester. The fight ended in a 12-round defeat for Hobson in what proved to be a tough defence for Maccarinelli. The Keeton defence followed before, on 8 September 2006, Hobson challenged for the WBU title at the third time of asking, defeating Pavol Polakovic at the Grosvenor House Hotel in Mayfair, London.

On 14 October 2006 Hobson returned to the MEN Arena in Manchester to once again take on Enzo Maccarinelli, this time for the WBO title in what was Maccarinelli's first defence of newly won world title. The fight ended in disappointment as Hobson was unable to match the performance of his first fight with the Welshman and suffered a first round stoppage.

Hobson's final fight before retiring from the ring was to challenge former victim John Keeton for the British title that Hobson himself had vacated. The fight on 29 September 2007 at the Hallam FM Arena in Sheffield ended in victory for Hobson once more, allowing him to retire from the sport as a British champion.

== Professional boxing record ==
| 33 fights | 27 wins | 5 losses |
|---|---|---|
| By knockout | 14 | 3 |
| By decision | 13 | 2 |
| Draws | 1 | |

| No. | Result | Record | Opponent | Type | Round, time | Date | Location | Notes |
|---|---|---|---|---|---|---|---|---|
| 33 | Win | 27–5–1 | (United Kingdom) John Keeton | TKO | 4 (12), 1:00 | 29 Sep 2007 | (United Kingdom) Sheffield Arena, Sheffield, England | Won British cruiserweight title |
| 32 | Loss | 26–5–1 | (United Kingdom) Enzo Maccarinelli | TKO | 1 (12), 1:11 | 14 Oct 2006 | (United Kingdom) M.E.N. Arena, Manchester, England | For WBO cruiserweight title |
| 31 | Win | 26–4–1 | (Czech Republic) Pavol Polakovic | UD | 12 | 8 Sep 2006 | (United Kingdom) Grosvenor House, London, England | Won WBU cruiserweight title |
| 30 | Win | 25–4–1 | (United Kingdom) John Keeton | TKO | 4 (12), 2:50 | 1 Jun 2006 | (United Kingdom) Barnsley Metrodome, Barnsley, England | Retained British and Commonwealth cruiserweight titles |
| 29 | Loss | 24–4–1 | (United Kingdom) Enzo Maccarinelli | UD | 12 | 4 Mar 2006 | (United Kingdom) M.E.N. Arena, Manchester, England | For WBU cruiserweight title |
| 28 | Win | 24–3–1 | (United Kingdom) Bruce Scott | PTS | 12 | 17 Dec 2004 | (United Kingdom) Huddersfield Sports Centre, Huddersfield, England | Retained British and Commonwealth cruiserweight titles |
| 27 | Win | 23–3–1 | (United Kingdom) Lee Swaby | TKO | 6 (12), 1:02 | 27 May 2004 | (United Kingdom) Huddersfield Sports Centre, Huddersfield, England | Retained British and Commonwealth cruiserweight titles |
| 26 | Win | 22–3–1 | (United Kingdom) Tony Moran | TKO | 3 (12), 2:10 | 13 Mar 2004 | (United Kingdom) Huddersfield Sports Centre, Huddersfield, England | Retained British and Commonwealth cruiserweight titles |
| 25 | Win | 21–3–1 | (United Kingdom) Rob Norton | PTS | 12 | 5 Sep 2003 | (United Kingdom) Ponds Forge Arena, Sheffield, England | Retained Commonwealth cruiserweight title; Won vacant British cruiserweight title |
| 24 | Win | 20–3–1 | (Russia) Muslim Biarslanov | TKO | 2 (8), 1:20 | 10 May 2003 | (United Kingdom) Huddersfield Sports Centre, Huddersfield, England | |
| 23 | Win | 19–3–1 | (Uganda) Abdul Kadou | TKO | 4 (12) | 25 Jan 2003 | (United Kingdom) Recreation Centre, Bridgend, Wales | Won vacant Commonwealth cruiserweight title |
| 22 | Win | 18–3–1 | (Armenia) Varuzhan Davtyan | TKO | 3 (6) | 5 Oct 2002 | (United Kingdom) Huddersfield Sports Centre, Huddersfield, England | |
| 21 | Win | 17–3–1 | (United Kingdom) Lee Swaby | PTS | 10 | 27 Apr 2002 | (United Kingdom) Huddersfield Sports Centre, Huddersfield, England | |
| 20 | Win | 16–3–1 | (Estonia) Valeri Semiskur | PTS | 6 | 23 Feb 2002 | (United Kingdom) Harvey Hadden Sports Centre, Nottingham, England | |
| 19 | Win | 15–3–1 | (United Kingdom) Luke Simpkin | RTD | 3 (4), 3:00 | 10 Dec 2001 | (United Kingdom) Everton Park Sports Centre, Liverpool, England | |
| 18 | Loss | 14–3–1 | (Germany) Firat Arslan | TKO | 7 (8) | 8 Oct 2001 | (United Kingdom) Barnsley Metrodome, Barnsley, England | |
| 17 | Loss | 14–2–1 | (South Africa) Sebastiaan Rothmann | RTD | 9 (12), 3:00 | 24 Apr 2001 | (United Kingdom) Olympia, Liverpool, England | For WBU cruiserweight title |
| 16 | Win | 14–1–1 | (United Kingdom) Billy Bessey | PTS | 4 | 26 Feb 2001 | (United Kingdom) Harvey Hadden Leisure Centre, Nottingham, England | |
| 15 | Win | 13–1–1 | (United Kingdom) Mark Lee Dawson | TKO | 1 (6) | 25 Sep 2000 | (United Kingdom) Barnsley Metrodome, Barnsley, England | |
| 14 | Win | 12–1–1 | (United Kingdom) Paul Bonson | PTS | 4 | 13 May 2000 | (United Kingdom) Barnsley Metrodome, Barnsley, England | |
| 13 | Win | 11–1–1 | (United Kingdom) Luke Simpkin | PTS | 6 | 27 Mar 2000 | (United Kingdom) Barnsley Metrodome, Barnsley, England | |
| 12 | Win | 10–1–1 | (Bulgaria) Nikolai Ermenkov | TKO | 3 (6) | 11 Mar 2000 | (United Kingdom) Olympia, London, England | |
| 11 | Win | 9–1–1 | (United Kingdom) Brian Gascoigne | TKO | 3 (6) | 6 Dec 1999 | (United Kingdom) Norfolk Gardens Hotel, Bradford, England | |
| 10 | Win | 8–1–1 | (United Kingdom) Paul Bonson | PTS | 4 | 11 Sept 1999 | (United Kingdom) Hillsborough Leisure Centre, Sheffield, England | |
| 9 | Loss | 7–1–1 | (United Kingdom) Mark Levy | PTS | 8 | 19 Apr 1999 | (United Kingdom) Stakis Hotel, Bradford, England | |
| 8 | Win | 7–0–1 | (United Kingdom) Danny Southeram | TKO | 5 (6) | 26 Nov 1998 | (United Kingdom) Stakis Hotel, Bradford, England | |
| 7 | Win | 6–0–1 | (United Kingdom) Mark Snipe | TKO | 3 (6) | 25 Oct 1998 | (United Kingdom) Tara Leisure Centre, Shaw and Crompton, England | |
| 6 | Win | 5–0–1 | (United Kingdom) Martin Jolley | TKO | 3 (6) | 15 Jun 1998 | (United Kingdom) Stakis Hotel, Bradford, England | |
| 5 | Win | 4–0–1 | (United Kingdom) Paul Bonson | PTS | 6 | 21 May 1998 | (United Kingdom) Ball Park Centre, Bradford, England | |
| 4 | Draw | 3–0–1 | (United Kingdom) Colin Brown | PTS | 6 | 27 Feb 1998 | (United Kingdom) Volunteer Rooms, Irvine, Scotland | |
| 3 | Win | 3–0 | (England) P.R. Mason | PTS | 6 | 13 Nov 1997 | (United Kingdom) Stakis Hotel, Bradford, England | |
| 2 | Win | 2–0 | (United Kingdom) P.R. Mason | PTS | 6 | 6 Oct 1997 | (United Kingdom) Norfolk Gardens Hotel, Bradford, England | |
| 1 | Win | 1–0 | (United Kingdom) Michael Pinnock | PTS | 6 | 9 Jun 1997 | (United Kingdom) Stakis Hotel, Bradford, England | |

| Preceded by Bruce Scott vacated | Commonwealth Cruiserweight Champion; 25 January 2001 – 19 March 2007 vacated | Succeeded by Troy Ross |
| Preceded by Bruce Scott vacated | British Cruiserweight Champion; 5 September 2003 – 20 October 2006 vacated | Succeeded by John Keeton |
| Preceded by John Keeton | British Cruiserweight Champion; 29 September 2007 – 3 October 2008 vacated | Succeeded by Robert Norton |
