= John Keeton =

British boxer (born 1972)

Personal information
- Nickname: Buster
- Nationality: British
- Born: 19 May 1972 (age 54) Sheffield, Yorkshire, England
- Height: 6 ft 0 in (183 cm)
- Weight: Cruiserweight; Heavyweight

Boxing career
- Stance: Orthodox

Boxing record
- Total fights: 45
- Wins: 28
- Win by KO: 20
- Losses: 17

John Keeton (born 19 May 1972) is a British former professional boxer who competed from 1993 to 2009. He held the British cruiserweight title and challenged twice for the Commonwealth cruiserweight title between 2006 and 2007.

== Early professional career ==
Keeton had his first professional contest on 11 August 1993, scoring a stoppage win over Tony Colclough in Mansfield. For the first three years of his career Keeton's results were a mixture of victories and defeats losing to the likes of Julius Francis, Bruce Scott and Nicky Piper. Following the Piper defeat on 7 July 1995, Keeton scored a run of five victories to earn a shot at the British title for the first time.

== British challenger and champion ==
Keeton's first fight for the British title ended in failure, losing to Terry Dunstan in the first round of their meeting at the York Hall in Bethnal Green on 11 May 1996. He earned another shot at the title on 16 December 2000, but lost once more, this time to Bruce Scott in the sixth round at the Sheffield Arena. His final unsuccessful fight for the title came on 1 June 2006 against Mark Hobson when the Commonwealth belt was also on the line at the Barnsley Metrodome. Success finally came Keeton's way on 20 October 2006, when the now vacant cruiserweight title was contested between himself and Lee Swaby resulting in a seventh round win and the championship belt. He lost the belt in his very first defence against former champion Mark Hobson on 29 September 2007, at the Hallam FM Arena in Sheffield.

== Title wins and challenges ==
In between his challenges for the British title, Keeton won a number of fringe title belts including the WBO Inter-continental cruiserweight title against Garry Delaney on 23 January 1999 in Cheshunt and the WBF cruiserweight title against Jake Kilrain on 19 March 2003 in Slough. He challenged unsuccessfully for the WBO Inter-continental title prior to winning it, losing to the undefeated Kelly Oliver on 11 October 1997. He travelled to Poland to contest the WBC Youth World cruiserweight title on 11 June 2000 losing to Krzysztof Wlodarczyk (and travelled to Canada to challenge for the Commonwealth title losing to Troy Ross on 19 March 2007.

== Prizefighter ==
After losing his British title to Mark Hobson in September 2007, Keeton took a break from the ring and only returned on 19 May 2009 to compete in the seventh Prizefighter tournament featuring the cruiserweights at Earls Court Exhibition Centre. He faced Bruce Scott in the first round, Keeton scored a knock down and won on points over three rounds. In the semi-finals he met Dean Francis, the former European and two-weight British champion, knocking him out in the first round. The final of the tournament pitched Keeton against Ovill McKenzie, who he lost to on points.

== Professional boxing record ==
45 fights	28 wins	17 losses
By knockout	20	13
By decision	8	4

No.	Result	Record	Opponent	Type	Round, time	Date	Location	Notes
45	Loss	28–17	Ovill McKenzie	UD	3	19 May 2009	Earls Court Arena, London, England	Prizefighter Cruiserweight Tournament Final
44	Win	28–16	Dean Francis	KO	1 (3), 2:35	19 May 2009	Earls Court Arena, London, England	Prizefighter Cruiserweight Tournament Semi-final
43	Win	27–16	Bruce Scott	UD	3	19 May 2009	Earls Court Arena, London, England	Prizefighter Cruiserweight Tournament Quarter-final
42	Loss	26–16	Mark Hobson	TKO	4 (12), 1:00	29 Sep 2007	Sheffied Arena, Sheffield, England	Lost British cruiserweight title
41	Loss	26–15	Troy Ross	KO	2 (12), 2:08	19 Mar 2007	Montreal Casino, Montreal, Canada	For vacant Commonwealth cruiserweight title
40	Win	26–14	Lee Swaby	TKO	7 (12), 2:29	20 Oct 2006	Don Valley Stadium, Sheffield, England	Won vacant British cruiserweight title
39	Loss	25–14	Mark Hobson	TKO	4 (12), 2:50	1 Jun 2006	Metrodome, Barnsley, England	For British and Commonwealth cruiserweight titles
38	Loss	25–13	Don Diego Poeder	KO	1 (10), 1:00	10 Sep 2005	Topsportcentrum, Rotterdam, Netherlands	For vacant Dutch cruiserweight title
37	Loss	25–12	Krzysztof Włodarczyk	RTD	3 (10), 3:00	11 Jun 2005	Gorzów Wielkopolski, Lubusz Voivodeship, Poland	For WBC Youth cruiserweight title
36	Win	25–11	Paul Bonson	PTS	4	14 May 2005	Beach Ballroom, Aberdeen, Scotland	
35	Win	24–11	Paul Bonson	PTS	4	16 Apr 2004	Town and Country Club (Penningtons), Bradford, England	
34	Win	23–11	Butch Lesley	PTS	12	19 Mar 2002	Montem Leisure Centre, Slough, England	Won vacant WBF cruiserweight title
33	Win	22–11	Radcliffe Green	PTS	4	21 Jul 2001	Ponds Forge Arena, Sheffield, England	
32	Loss	21–11	Bruce Scott	KO	6 (12)	16 Dec 2000	Sheffield Arena, Sheffield, England	For vacant British cruiserweight title
31	Win	21–10	Tony Booth	TKO	2 (4)	29 Feb 2000	Kingsway Leisure Centre, Widnes, England	
30	Win	20–10	William Barima	RTD	3 (6), 3:00	15 May 1999	Ponds Forge Arena, Sheffield, England	
29	Win	19–10	Garry Delaney	SD	12	23 Jan 1999	Grundy Park Leisure Centre, Cheshunt, England	Won vacant WBO Inter-Continental cruiserweight title
28	Win	18–10	Kelly Oliver	TKO	2 (6), 0:50	18 Jul 1998	Sheffield Arena, Sheffield, England	
27	Loss	17–10	Jacob Mofokeng	RTD	4 (10)	16 May 1998	Carousel Casino, Hammanskraal, South Africa	
26	Loss	17–9	Kelly Oliver	TKO	8 (12), 1:29	11 Oct 1997	Sheffield Arena, Sheffield, England	For vacant WBO Inter-Continental cruiserweight title
25	Win	17–8	Nigel Rafferty	TKO	6 (6), 0:48	12 Apr 1997	Hillsborough Leisure Centre, Sheffield, England	
24	Win	16–8	Nigel Rafferty	RTD	3 (6)	14 Dec 1996	Ponds Forge Arena, Sheffield, England	
23	Win	15–8	John Pierre	PTS	4	14 Sep 1996	Concord Centre, Sheffield, England	
22	Loss	14–8	Terry Dunstan	TKO	1 (12)	11 May 1996	York Hall, Lonfon, England	For British cruiserweight title
21	Win	14–7	Cesar Kazadi	TKO	3 (8)	30 Jan 1996	Lille, Hauts-de-France, France	
20	Win	13–7	Denzil Browne	TKO	4 (8), 2:06	11 Nov 1995	North Bridge Leisure Centre, Halifax, England	
19	Win	12–7	Monty Wright	TKO	4 (8)	3 Nov 1995	Town Hall, Dudley, England	
18	Win	11–7	Nicky Wadman	TKO	1 (6)	27 Oct 1995	Metropole Hotel, Brighton, England	
17	Win	10–7	Steve Osborne	TKO	4 (6)	15 Sep 1995	Mansfield Leisure Centre, Mansfield, England	
16	Loss	9–7	Nicky Piper	RTD	2 (8), 3:00	7 Jul 1995	National Ice Rink, Cardiff, Wales	
15	Win	9–6	Simon McDougall	TKO	5 (8)	6 Mar 1995	Mayfair Marriott Hotel, London, England	
14	Loss	8–6	Rüdiger May	UD	6	11 Feb 1995	Festhalle, Frankfurt, Germany	
13	Loss	8–5	Bruce Scott	KO	2 (8)	9 Dec 1994	York Hall, London, England	
12	Win	8–4	Lee Archer	PTS	6	26 Oct 1994	European Sporting Club, Stoke-on-Trent, England	
11	Loss	7–4	Dirk Wallyn	KO	3 (6)	24 Sep 1994	Middelkerke, West Flanders, Belgium	
10	Win	7–3	Mark Walker	TKO	5 (6)	6 Sep 1994	European Sporting Club, Stoke-on-Trent, England	
9	Win	6–3	Devon Rhooms	TKO	2 (6)	2 Jun 1994	Tooting Leisure Centre, London, England	
8	Win	5–3	John Rice	TKO	5 (6)	11 May 1994	Ponds Forge Arena, Sheffield, England	
7	Win	4–3	Eddie Knight	RTD	5 (6)	9 Apr 1994	Mansfield Leisure Centre, Mansfield, England	
6	Loss	3–3	Dermot Gascoyne	TKO	1 (6)	17 Feb 1994	Goresbrook Leisure Centre, London, England	
5	Win	3–2	Dennis Bailey	RTD	2 (6)	19 Jan 1994	European Sporting Club, Stoke-on-Trent, England	
4	Loss	2–2	Julius Francis	PTS	4	1 Dec 1993	York Hall, London, England	
3	Win	2–1	Darren McKenna	TKO	3 (6)	27 Oct 1993	European Sporting Club, Stoke-on-Trent, England	
2	Loss	1–1	Val Golding	PTS	6	15 Sep 1993	Stour Centre, Ashford, England	
1	Win	1–0	Tony Colclough	TKO	1 (6)	11 Aug 1993	Mansfield Leisure Centre, Mansfield, England	
