= Victor Emilio Ramírez =

Argentine boxer (born 1984)

Personal information
- Nicknames: El Tyson del Abasto ("The Tyson of Abasto")
- Born: 30 March 1984 (age 42) Ezeiza, Buenos Aires, Argentina
- Height: 5 ft 11 in (180 cm)
- Weight: Cruiserweight; Heavyweight

Boxing career
- Reach: 69 in (175 cm)
- Stance: Orthodox

Boxing record
- Total fights: 38
- Wins: 31
- Win by KO: 25
- Losses: 5
- Draws: 1
- No contests: 1

Victor Emilio Ramírez (born 30 March 1984) is an Argentine professional boxer. He is a two-time cruiserweight world champion, having previously held the International Boxing Federation (IBF) title from 2015 to 2016, and the World Boxing Organization (WBO) title from 2008 to 2009.

== Professional career ==
=== Early career ===
Ramírez made his professional boxing debut at the age of 22 as a heavyweight on 8 April 2006, against 32-year-old Miguel Angel Pacheco at the Estadio Luna Park in Buenos Aires, Argentina. Ramírez won the fight via unanimous decision after four rounds. Ramírez then fought three times in the space of five months at the Club El Porvenir in San Miguel del Monte, Buenos Aires winning all fights inside the distance against Roberto Martinez, Jose Norberto Gomez and Mario Javier Moreno. Ramírez suffered his first defeat on his 7th fight in December 2006 against Sebastian Ignacio Ceballos via majority decision with judges scores of 56–59, 56–57 and 57½–57½.

Ramírez took six months out before returning in June 2007 against Claudio Carlos Roque Fernandez, who outweighed Ramírez by over 100 pounds. In a scheduled six round bout, the fight ended as no contest in round two as the ring crumbled by the weight of the boxers and the referee. Over the next year, Ramírez racked up a five fight win streak before winning his first title at cruiserweight against Mauro Adrian Ordiales (20–4, 19 KOs), retiring him after 11 rounds. Ramírez claimed the vacant South American cruiserweight title with the win. His next fight in December 2008, Ramírez retained the title and won the vacant WBO Latino cruiserweight title with a 2nd-round knockout off Hector Ricardo Sotelo. Sotelo was down twice in the 1st round & once in the 2nd round.

=== WBO cruiserweight champion ===
==== Ramírez vs. Alekseyev ====
Ramírez fought the undefeated Aleksandr Alekseyev (16–0, 15 KOs) at the Burg-Waechter Castello in Düsseldorf, Germany, on 17 January 2009, for the vacant interim WBO world cruiserweight title. Alekseyev entered as the WBO # 2 cruiserweight contender, while Ramírez entered as the WBO # 7 cruiserweight contender. Alekseyev's corner threw in the towel after round 9, giving Ramírez his first world title.

==== Ramírez vs. Ismailov ====
Ramírez was promoted to full title holder and made his first defence against 35 year old Ali Ismailov in May 2009 in his native Argentina. In a fight were no knockdowns occurred, Ramírez retained his world title via split decision. Two judges scored it for Ramírez at 116–112 and 115–113 and one judge had it for Ismailov 115–113.

==== Ramírez vs. Huck ====
It was announced that Ramírez would make his second defence on 29 August 2009, against former IBF world title challenger Marco Huck (25–1, 20 KOs) at the Gerry Weber Stadium in Germany. Huck won the WBO cruiserweight title via a unanimous decision with two judges scoring it 116–111 and the third judge scoring it 115–112. Huck had a point deducted in round 12 following repeated low blows. Ramírez loudly disapproved of Huck claiming victory when the final bell sounded, and disagreed with the verdict. Huck went on to defend the title a record equalling 13 times.

=== Comeback in 2013 ===
Ramírez returned to boxing at the age of 28 in December 2013 in Argentina against Thabiso Mogale (14–13–2, 9 KOs) in a scheduled four round fight, winning via first-round knockout.

==== IBF Latino cruiserweight ====
In his next fight in January 2014, Ramírez won a 10-round unanimous decision (100–90, 100–90, 98–92) to win the vacant IBF Latino cruiserweight title. Ramírez successfully defended the title four times in 2014, winning all the fights inside the distance. At the end of 2014, his record was 21 wins, 2 losses with 17 wins by way of knockout.

=== IBF cruiserweight champion ===
==== Ramírez vs. Afolabi ====
With successive defences of the Latino title, Ramírez climbed the IBF rankings earning him a fight for the interim IBF cruiserweight title against Ola Afolabi (21–3–4, 10 KOs). The fight took place on 10 April 2015, at the Villa La Ñata Sporting Club in Benavídez, Buenos Aires, Argentina. The winner would then go on to fight IBF champion Yoan Pablo Hernandez, who was nursing an elbow injury. They went the full 12 round distance as Ramírez became a two time world champion with the judges scoring it 115–111, 115–111 and 116–111 in his favour. Afolabi appeared to win the seventh and ninth rounds, and perhaps the tenth, outworking Ramírez technically to some degree. After issuing Afolabi two warnings for low blows, referee Pete Podgorski penalized Afolabi two points in the eleventh round for a flagrant low blow. Without the two point deduction, Afolabi had to win one more round for the fight to end in a majority draw.

==== Promoted to full champion ====
In June 2015, it was finally announced that Ramírez would fight full IBF champion Yoan Pablo Hernandez in Argentina on 25 July. The fight was postponed to a future date in September. In September, Ramírez was made full titleholder after the IBF stripped Hernandez, declining him a chance to reschedule the fight for a second time. Hernandez hadn't defended the title in 13 months.

==== Ramírez vs. McKenzie ====
On 22 September, it was confirmed that Ramírez would make his first defence of his IBF title against journeyman Ovill McKenzie (25–12, 13 KOs) on 2 October in Buenos Aires. McKenzie was on a four fight unbeaten run. Ramírez retained his world title after the fight ended in a split decision draw after 12 rounds in a fight many thought McKenzie had done enough to win. Promoter Frank Warren said he believed McKenzie deserves an immediate rematch. In the post fight interviews, McKenzie said, "The only thing that's bruised on me is my hands and my faith in the IBF." One judge had the fight 114–114, while the other two had it 115–113 for either fighter.

==== Ramírez vs. Lebedev ====
Following the draw against McKenzie, Ramírez quickly began pursuing a unification match against WBA champion Denis Lebedev. It was announced the fight would take place on 20 April 2016, in Moscow. The fight was later rescheduled for 21 May and supposed to be a co-feature with WBC heavyweight title fight between Deontay Wilder and Alexander Povetkin, until it was cancelled when Povetkin tested positive for drugs. Ramírez was no match for Lebedev in losing in just two rounds. Lebedev put Ramírez down in the 2nd round after a fairly even first round. Lebedev finished Ramírez off with a flurry of shots that had him turning his back to Lebedev at one point before it was halted. The fight was stopped at 1:57 of the round by referee Steve Smoger.

=== Temporary retirement ===
On 27 December 2016, Ramírez announced his retirement from boxing. Citing that he no longer had motivation, "I do not want to come back to the ring to fight. I got tired of training and having to lose weight. No more."

=== Heavyweight ===
Ramírez fought at the China show in Beijing, China on 18 December 2017, against undefeated Chinese heavyweight contender Zhang Junlong (17–0, 17 KOs). Junlong's WBA Oceania title was at stake. Zhang put Ramírez down twice with vicious body shots. He was badly hurt and never get up. Referee Ferlin Marsh stopped the one-sided fight at 1:36 in the opening round. This was the sixth WBA Oceania heavyweight title defence for Zhang, who knocked out all the challengers in one or two rounds. This fight has since been removed from Boxing record database website BoxRec. It is unclear if this was an exhibition fightt or if the bout even took place.

== Professional boxing record ==
38 fights	31 wins	5 losses
By knockout	25	3
By decision	5	2
By disqualification	1	0
Draws	1	
No contests	1	

No.	Result	Record	Opponent	Type	Round, time	Date	Location	Notes
38	Win	31–5–1 (1)	Ricky Torrez	KO	1 (10)	2024-11-23	Polideportivo vecinal, San Francisco Solano, Argentina	Retained South American heavyweight title; Won vacant WBA Fedebol heavyweight title
37	Loss	30–5–1 (1)	Peter Kadiru	RTD	8 (12)	2024-03-16	Vogelsanghalle Stralsund, Stralsund, Germany	For vacant IBF Inter-Continental heavyweight title
36	Win	30–4–1 (1)	Esteban Raul Lopez	DQ	8 (10)	2023-09-02	Estadio José María Gatica, Villa Domínico, Argentina	Won vacant South American heavyweight title
35	Win	29–4–1 (1)	Carlos Adán Jerez	TKO	3 (6)	2023-07-29	Club Atlético River Plate, Buenos Aires, Argentina	
34	Win	28–4–1 (1)	Hector Carlos Santana	KO	2 (8)	2022-11-11	Polideportivo Butalo, Santa Rosa, Argentina	
33	Loss	27–4–1 (1)	Arslan Yallyev	RTD	7 (10)	2021-04-01	Basket-Hall, Krasnodar, Russia	
32	Win	27–3–1 (1)	Julio Enrique Cuellar Cabrera	TKO	1 (10)	2019-10-25	Centro de Eventos, Santa Cruz de la Sierra, Bolivia	
31	Win	26–3–1 (1)	Dany Lobo	KO	1 (8)	2019-08-16	Salon de Usos Multiples Municipal, Lonquimay, Argentina	
30	Win	25–3–1 (1)	Jorge Dario Tartuferi	KO	2 (6)	2019-05-24	Polideportivo Municipal, Centenario, Argentina	
29	Win	24–3–1 (1)	Wilfredo German Arce	TKO	1 (6)	2019-03-23	Club Costa Brava, General Rodríguez, Argentina	
28	Win	23–3–1 (1)	Cristhian Nazareno Fernandez	KO	1 (8)	2019-02-09	Club Salto Uruguayo, Salto, Uruguay	
27	Loss	22–3–1 (1)	Denis Lebedev	TKO	2 (12)	2016-05-21	Khodynka Ice Palace, Moscow, Russia	Lost IBF cruiserweight title
26	Draw	22–2–1 (1)	Ovill McKenzie	SD	12 (12)	2015-10-02	Villa La Ñata Sporting Club, Tigre Partido, Argentina	Retained IBF cruiserweight title
25	Win	22–2 (1)	Ola Afolabi	UD	12 (12)	2015-04-10	Villa La Ñata Sporting Club, Tigre Partido, Argentina	Won Interim IBF cruiserweight title
24	Win	21–2 (1)	Deon Elam	KO	2 (10)	2014-10-31	Teatro Griego Juan Pablo Segundo, San Martín, Argentina	Retained IBF Latino cruiserweight title
23	Win	20–2 (1)	Cleiton Conceição	KO	4 (10)	2014-07-19	Villa La Ñata Sporting Club, Tigre Partido, Argentina	Retained IBF Latino cruiserweight title
22	Win	19–2 (1)	Glendy Hernandez	TKO	4 (10)	2014-03-21	Villa La Ñata Sporting Club, Tigre Partido, Argentina	Retained IBF Latino cruiserweight title
21	Win	18–2 (1)	Danny Santiago	TKO	4 (10)	2014-01-31	Piso de los Deportes, Mar del Plata, Argentina	Retained IBF Latino cruiserweight title
20	Win	17–2 (1)	Mariano Ruben Diaz Strunz	UD	10 (10)	2014-01-04	Piso de los Deportes, Mar del Plata, Argentina	Won vacant IBF Latino cruiserweight title
19	Win	16–2 (1)	Thabiso Mogale	TKO	1 (4)	2013-12-21	Villa La Ñata Sporting Club, Tigre Partido, Argentina	
18	Loss	15–2 (1)	Marco Huck	UD	12 (12)	2009-08-29	Gerry Weber Stadium, Halle, Germany	Lost WBO cruiserweight title
17	Win	15–1 (1)	Ali Ismayilov	SD	12 (12)	2009-05-16	Estadio Luna Park, Buenos Aires, Argentina	Retained WBO cruiserweight title
16	Win	14–1 (1)	Aleksandr Alekseyev	RTD	9 (12)	2009-01-17	Castello Düsseldorf, Düsseldorf, Germany	Won Interim WBO cruiserweight title
15	Win	13–1 (1)	Hector Ricardo Sotelo	TKO	2 (12)	2008-12-04	Estadio Luna Park, Buenos Aires, Argentina	Retained South American cruiserweight title; Won vacant WBO Latino cruiserweight title
14	Win	12–1 (1)	Mauro Adrian Ordiales	RTD	11 (12)	2008-08-30	Ce.De.M. N° 2, Caseros, Argentina	Won vacant South American cruiserweight title
13	Win	11–1 (1)	Mauro Adrian Ordiales	MD	6 (6)	2008-05-10	Club Huracán, Tres Arroyos, Argentina	
12	Win	10–1 (1)	Ivan Carlos Protti	TKO	4 (6)	2008-02-23	Club Social y Deportivo, Mar de Ajó, Argentina	
11	Win	9–1 (1)	Adolfo Obando	TKO	2 (6)	2007-12-14	Polideportivo Municipal Carlos Cerutti, Córdoba, Argentina	
10	Win	8–1 (1)	Cesar Dario Heredia	TKO	1 (4)	2007-08-18	Club Tomás de Rocamora, Concepción del Uruguay, Argentina	
9	Win	7–1 (1)	Miguel Angel Morales	RTD	2 (6)	2007-07-21	Club Estudiantes, Santa Rosa, Argentina	
8	NC	6–1 (1)	Claudio Carlos Roque Fernandez	NC	2 (6)	2007-06-08	Escuela Nº 6, San Carlos de Bolívar, Argentina	The ring collapsed during fight
7	Loss	6–1	Sebastian Ignacio Ceballos	MD	6 (6)	2006-12-22	Buenos Aires Lawn Tennis Club, Buenos Aires, Argentina	
6	Win	6–0	Fernando Sebastian Santander	KO	1 (6)	2006-11-24	Club Tomás de Rocamora, Concepción del Uruguay, Argentina	
5	Win	5–0	Ivan Carlos Protti	TKO	1 (4)	2006-10-14	Estadio Luna Park, Buenos Aires, Argentina	
4	Win	4–0	Mario Javier Moreno	TKO	1 (4)	2006-09-15	Club El Porvenir, Lanús Partido, Argentina	
3	Win	3–0	Jose Norberto Gomez	TKO	2 (4)	2006-07-14	Club Social y Recreativo, Curuzú Cuatiá, Argentina	
2	Win	2–0	Roberto Martinez	TKO	2 (4)	2006-05-19	Club El Porvenir, Lanús Partido, Argentina	
1	Win	1–0	Miguel Angel Pacheco	UD	4 (4)	2006-04-08	Estadio Luna Park, Buenos Aires, Argentina	

== See also ==
- List of male boxers
- List of world cruiserweight boxing champions

Sporting positions
Regional boxing titles
Vacant Title last held by Jorge Castro	South American cruiserweight champion 30 August 2008 – 17 January 2009; Won interim title	Vacant Title next held by Rogelio Omar Rossi
Vacant Title last held by Ali Ismayilov	WBO Latino cruiserweight champion 4 December 2008 – 17 January 2009; Won interim title	Vacant Title next held by Laudelino Barros
Vacant Title last held by Jaime Quinonez	IBF Latino cruiserweight champion 4 January 2014 – 10 April 2015; Won interim title	Vacant Title next held by Claudio Squeo
Vacant Title last held by Leandro Daniel Robutti	South American heavyweight champion 2 September 2023 – present	Incumbent
New title	WBA Fedebol heavyweight champion 23 November 2024 – present	Incumbent
World boxing titles
Vacant Title last held by Enzo Maccarinelli	WBO cruiserweight champion Interim title 17 January 2009 – 14 July 2008; Promoted	Vacant Title next held by Ola Afolabi
Preceded by David Haye; Vacated	WBO cruiserweight champion 14 July 2008 – 29 August 2009	Succeeded by Marco Huck
New title	IBF cruiserweight champion Interim title 10 April 2015 – 22 September 2015; Promoted	Vacant
Preceded by Yoan Pablo Hernández; Stripped	IBF cruiserweight champion 22 September 2015 – 21 May 2016	Succeeded by Denis Lebedev
