= Enzo Maccarinelli =

Welsh boxer (born 1980)

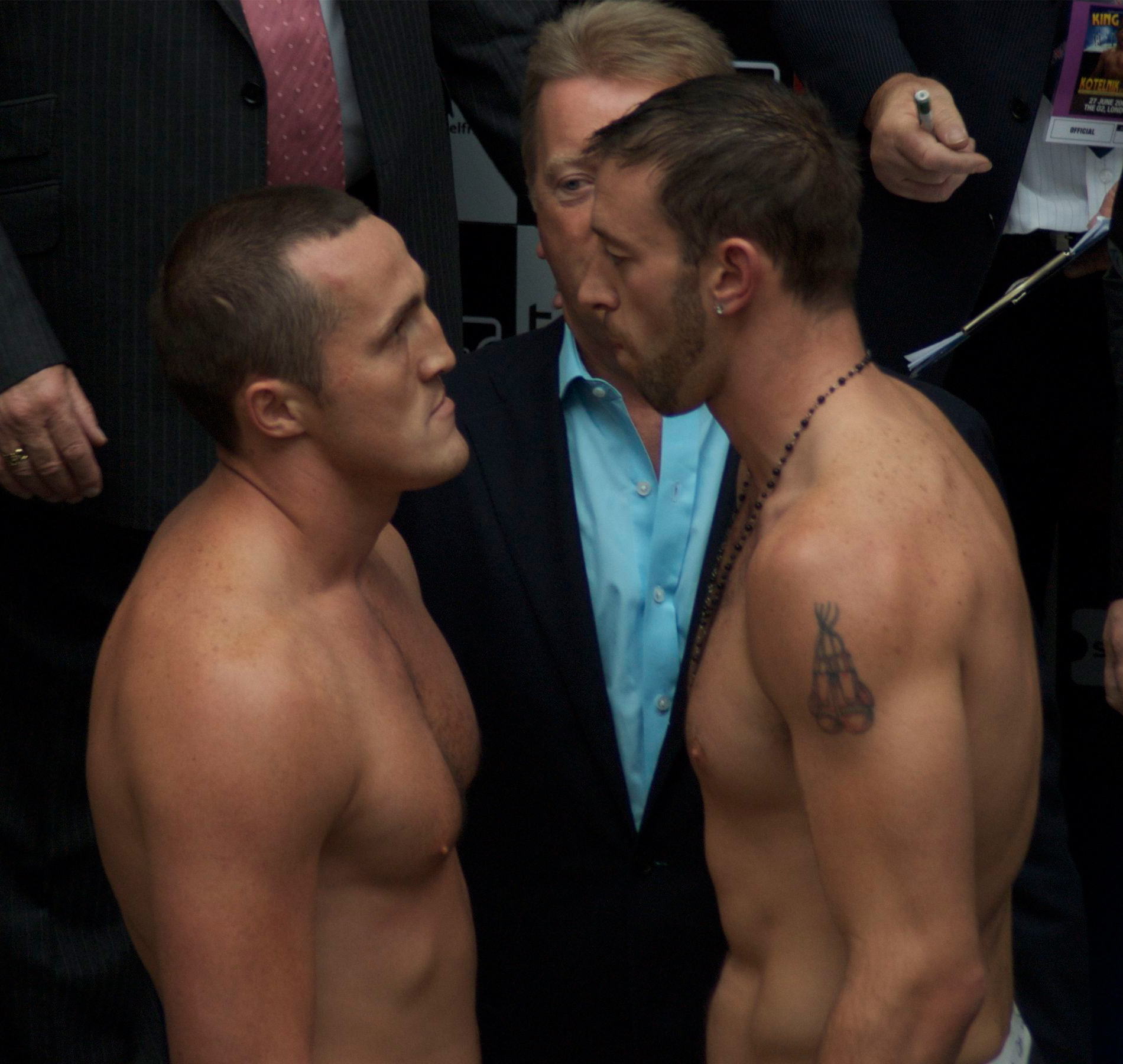
- Maccarinelli (right) and Lebedev, 2009

Personal information
- Nickname: Big Mac
- Born: 20 August 1980 (age 46) Swansea, Wales
- Height: 6 ft 4 in (193 cm)
- Weight: Light-heavyweight; Cruiserweight

Boxing career
- Reach: 74 in (188 cm)
- Stance: Orthodox

Boxing record
- Total fights: 49
- Wins: 41
- Win by KO: 33
- Losses: 8

Enzo Maccarinelli (born 20 August 1980) is a Welsh former professional boxer who competed from 1999 to 2016. He held the World Boxing Organisation (WBO) cruiserweight world title from 2006 to 2008. At regional level, he held the European and British cruiserweight titles between 2010 and 2012, and the Commonwealth light-heavyweight title in 2013.

== Early life ==
Maccarinelli was born in Swansea, United Kingdom to Elizabeth (née Leyshon) and Mario Maccarinelli. His father had emigrated to Wales in the 1950s from Lake Garda in Italy. Mario had been a boxing champion in the Italian army and had continued his boxing career in South Wales, competing in local amateur events. Mario took over ownership of Bonymaen Amateur Boxing Club in 1985 and encouraged Enzo into the sport from a young age. Enzo began attending the gym from the age of four before properly beginning training at the age of eight and having his first competitive fight at ten. Maccarinelli also took up kickboxing and achieved a brown belt in the discipline.

He won his first youth title the same year and won eight more during his early career. Maccarinelli's lifestyle soon affected his fights as he often skipped training to meet with friends. His father later remarked that "Enzo wasn't preparing himself properly ... he was overweight as he wouldn't stop eating. He wouldn't listen to me." However, his father continued that, in Enzo "We knew we had something special". As a teenager, Maccarinelli worked as an apprentice bricklayer alongside his boxing after leaving school but gave up the profession after suffering a fractured bone in his hand when a falling breeze block landed on it.

== Professional career ==
=== Early career ===
Maccarinelli turned professional in 1999, but employed a new trainer after parting ways with his father who noted "I couldn't push him to be world champion because he'd answer me back". The pair instead hired Charlie Pearson, a former trainer of fellow Welsh boxer Nicky Piper. Maccarinelli made his professional debut on 2 October 1999 against Paul Bonson, winning a points decision over four rounds at the Cardiff International Arena. In the following four months, he won two further fights, both by TKO.

In his fourth professional fight, Maccarinelli suffered his first defeat in a shock upset against southpaw Lee Swaby at Swansea Leisure Centre. Maccarinelli was regarded as a bright prospect ahead of the bout and the fight was the headline of an event broadcast in live television. He had been in the ascendancy in the early rounds and had knocked down Swaby on one occasion before Swaby won the fight after stopping Maccarinelli in the third round. Maccarinelli has attributed the defeat to his lifestyle at the time, as he spent the build up to the fight drinking and eating junk food, later commenting " I wasn't living the life. There's a picture somewhere of me two nights before the fight, out in town. I shouldn't have been out, and I think I believed my own hype". He later admitted to rewatching the fight on more than one occasion to "keep his feet on the ground.

Maccarinelli returned to the ring seven months later to defeat Chris Woollas on points. Between 2001 and January 2003, Maccarinelli embarked on a winning streak, winning a further eight bouts to move onto nine consecutive wins. Ahead of a bout against Estonian Valeri Semiskur, he failed an eye exam as part of his medical before the fight. He later revealed that he had suffered from poor eyesight since the start of his career, but had repeatedly passed the medicals by asking a friend to take the test beforehand and note the answers. This ruse was only discovered ahead of the Semiskur bout when the optician changed the test board without Maccarinelli knowing. As a result, he underwent laser eye surgery before the bout to fix the problem. He went on to defeat Semiskur by TKO in the first round at the Mountbatten Centre in Portsmouth.

=== First world title ===
On 28 June 2003, Maccarinelli fought Bruce Scott for the vacant WBU cruiserweight title. He suffered a nervy start and was knocked down in the first minute by Scott but managed to get back to his feet. Maccarinelli slowly gained the ascendancy and secured his first WBU title in the fourth round after knocking Scott out with a left hook. In doing so, he became the first boxer from Swansea to win a version of the world title. He made his first defence of the title three months later, stopping Estonian Andrej Karsten with an uppercut in the first minute of their bout at the Newport Centre. His title victory and defence led to him being voted British Boxing Writer's Club young fighter of the year for 2003.

Maccarinelli's second defence was originally scheduled to be against Chile's Carlos Cruzat, but his opponent was forced to withdraw shortly before the bout due to injury. Instead, South African Earl Morais was chosen as a late replacement. The fight again ended in the first round as Maccarinelli stopped Morais with a left hook after 90 seconds. His promoter Frank Warren commented after the fight that Maccarinelli was "one of the hardest punchers in the world". In his third defence of the title, Maccarinelli overcame Gary Delaney in Cardiff. He knocked his opponent down seven times during the bout before the fight was eventually stopped in the eighth round, the first time Maccarinelli had been past the fourth round in his career. The experienced Delaney would later become part of Maccarinelli's camp for fights later in the year after offering to assist him after their bout.

A fight against Cruzat was again postponed when the Chilean suffered an ankle injury during his training camp, with Ismail Abdoul stepping in to take his place. Maccarinelli endured a frustrating bout against Abdoul, going the full distance for the first time in his career in what Steve Bunce described as "12 seriously repetitive rounds". He won the fight by unanimous decision.

He made seven successful defences of his WBU title before vacating.

=== WBO cruiserweight champion ===
On 8 July 2006, Maccarinelli fought against former World Boxing Council (WBC) cruiserweight world champion Marcelo Fabian Domínguez for the WBO interim cruiserweight title. Maccarinelli won the title with a ninth-round TKO. The natural progression was a title fight against the then WBO title holder, Johnny Nelson. Due to several injuries to Nelson this matchup never transpired, and on 22 September 2006 he announced his retirement, automatically relinquishing the belt and allowing Maccarinelli to be promoted to full champion status.

==== Title defences ====
On 14 October 2006 Maccarinelli made his first defence of the WBO world title, stopping former opponent Mark Hobson in the first round in a fight that was widely expected to last the distance. This was followed by another first round win over Bobby Gunn on 7 April 2007 at the Millennium Stadium, Cardiff. The Gunn fight was stopped with just :25 seconds remaining in the first round by referee Mark Nelson, even though Gunn was not down and only had a small cut. It was widely and erroneously reported that Maccarinelli had broken Bobby Gunn's nose, but it was a small cut to the bridge of the nose that caused the bleeding. Gunn's nose was not broken and most observers at ringside thought the fight was stopped prematurely.

On 21 July 2007 Maccarinelli defended his WBO cruiserweight championship against former WBC world champ Wayne Braithwaite and won by unanimous decision, after dominating the match. On 3 November 2007 Maccarinelli successfully defended his WBO cruiserweight world title against Mohamed Azzaoui winning by TKO in the 4th Round.

=== 'Bombs Away' and loss of title ===
Maccarinelli's next fight was an all-British unification fight against the WBA/WBC champion David Haye. The fight took place on 8 March 2008 at the O2 Arena, London and was much hyped in the weeks running up to the event, being given the tagline "bombs away" (referring to the high KO percentages and punching power both men boasted). Maccarinelli lost the fight and his WBO belt when he was knocked out in the 2nd round. A right hand by Haye knocked Maccarinelli down towards the end of the round and although he was able to get back up it was on unsteady legs and the referee stepped in to stop the fight.

After the fight Haye announced that he would be moving up to the heavyweight division with immediate effect and would therefore be vacating his newly won belts. Because of this Maccarinelli received an immediate opportunity to reclaim his WBO belt in a matchup against undefeated American Jonathon Banks for the now vacant championship, but due to injury Banks was forced to pull out. After several replacements were unable to fight, Maccarinelli instead stepped up to heavyweight to face Matthew Ellis. Maccarinelli won after a 2nd-round KO in what was his debut at the higher weight. After the fight Frank Warren announced that Maccarinelli would face Banks in a rescheduled bout for the WBO belt during February 2009.

Once again the Banks fight proved to be a non-starter (Banks opted to make an ultimately unsuccessful attempt to win the IBF cruiserweight title against Tomasz Adamek) and instead Maccarinelli's next fight was against the American-based Londoner Ola Afolabi for the "interim" WBO title. The fight took place on 14 March at the M.E.N. Arena in Manchester, on the undercard of the Amir Khan vs. Marco Antonio Barrera bout. Maccarinelli was favoured by most observers to win, however things did not go as expected as Maccarinelli struggled in the early rounds and was staggered in the 3rd round by a short chopping right hand from the slick Afolabi. Despite managing to recover and win the majority of the next few rounds he was knocked out by Afolabi in round 9 when a huge overhand right put him on the canvas and forced the referee to call off the fight.

=== Lebedev fight, retirement, and return ===
Maccarinelli's next fight was against the unbeaten Russian Denis Lebedev on 18 July 2009. As with the Afolabi contest the fight took place at the M.E.N. Arena on the undercard of an Amir Khan fight, this time Khan's WBA light-welterweight title challenge against Andreas Kotelnik. From the very beginning of the fight Maccarinelli struggled with the power of his opponent and by the end of the second round his right eye had swollen completely shut from the punches landed by Lebedev. In the third round Lebedev rocked Maccarinelli with an uppercut which landed cleanly through his guard and after a further barrage of unanswered punches the referee stepped in and called a stop to the fight.

Before the fight Maccarinelli had admitted that the contest represented "the last chance saloon" in terms of getting his career back on track, following 2 KO losses in his last 3 fights, and talking immediately after the defeat he hinted that this latest setback could signal the end of his boxing career. In an interview with his local paper a few days later Maccarinelli apparently confirmed his intention to retire from the sport, although he retracted this in a later interview with the same source.

Maccarinelli began his latest comeback attempt on another Amir Khan undercard, this time Khan's WBA Light-Welterweight title defence against on 5 December at the Metro Radio Arena in Newcastle. His opponent was the relatively unknown Hungarian journeyman Krisztian Jaksi. who provided little resistance and was knocked out in the 1st round. Maccarinelli managed a second consecutive 1st-round KO victory against Hungarian opposition when he defeated Zoltan Czekus at the Echo Arena Liverpool on 13 March 2010.

=== European cruiserweight title shot ===
Following his two quick comeback wins Maccarinelli's next fight took place on 27 April 2010 when he fought Russian prospect Alexander Kotlobay in St Petersburg for the vacant European cruiserweight title. Despite now being the fighter that had to travel and fight on someone else's patch, Maccarinelli scored his third consecutive quick victory when he knocked Kotlobay down with an overhand right before the referee stepped in to end the fight at 2:15 of the first round.

His first defence of his newly won title came as part of Frank Warren's "Magnificent Seven" fight card, which took place on 18 September 2010 at the LG Arena in Birmingham. His opponent for this defence was the undefeated Ukrainian prospect Alexander Frenkel. Despite a tentative opening round Maccarinelli improved and managed to rock his opponent in the fourth round with a right hand. A clash of heads in the sixth led to a cut developing over his right eye, however the fight still appeared to be going Maccarinelli's way until he was knocked down heavily towards the end of round seven by a left hook from Frenkel. Despite managing to rise by the count of nine he was extremely unsteady and appeared to be in no position to defend himself. However the referee allowed the bout to continue, only for it to be stopped a few seconds later when a three punch combination from Frenkel led to a second knockdown. The final blows were struck with such ferocity that Maccarinelli was knocked unconscious and required oxygen and medical attention before being able to leave the ring. At the time of the fight there was heavy criticism from both journalists and fellow boxers at the decision by the referee to allow the fight to continue after the first knockdown, when it was clear that Maccarinelli was in no position to defend himself.

As with the aftermath of the Afolabi and Lebedev defeats there were also calls for Maccarinelli to retire from the ring, something which the boxer himself admitted to the press was a distinct possibility following his fourth KO loss in eight fights.

=== Move to light-heavyweight ===
After a period of inactivity following the Frenkel defeat, in February 2011 Maccarinelli announced that rather than retiring he would instead be dropping down in weight to compete in the 175 lb light-heavyweight division, with a view to having his first fight at the weight limit later on in the year.

Several months later he made the further announcement that he would once again be working with former coach Enzo Calzaghe, who was part of Maccarinelli's team during his successful run at cruiserweight. At the same time he also expressed a desire to fight for a world title at the new weight limit in the future, and in particular put forward the idea of an all Welsh title fight between himself and current WBO belt holder Nathan Cleverly.

Exactly 14 months after his last in-ring appearance Maccarinelli's first fight at the new weight limit took place at the York Hall in Bethnal Green on 18 November 2011. As with 2 of his previous 4 fights at cruiserweight the opponent was a Hungarian fighter, this time the undefeated (and relatively unknown) Gyorgy Marosi. Maccarinelli emerged victorious, scoring a 1st-round TKO victory after just 99 seconds against an overmatched Marosi.

Following the successful debut at 175 lbs Maccarinelli reiterated his desire to fight for a world title at 175 lbs and again made reference to an all Welsh bout with Cleverly, although ruled out the prospect of such a matchup occurring straight away.

In July 2012, Maccarinelli was banned for six months after testing positive for Methylhexaneamine.

=== Return to cruiserweight and final retirement ===
In 2015 Maccarinelli returned to cruiserweight and in December knocked out the then 46-year-old Roy Jones Jr. in the fourth round at the VTB Ice Palace in Moscow. In June 2016 he fought Dmytro Kucher for the vacant European cruiserweight title, but lost by TKO in the first round, subsequently announcing his retirement from boxing.

== Professional boxing record ==
49 fights	41 wins	8 losses
By knockout	33	8
By decision	8	0

No.	Result	Record	Opponent	Type	Round, time	Date	Location	Notes
49	Loss	41–8	Dmytro Kucher	TKO	1 (12), 2:48	10 Jun 2016	York Hall, London, England	For vacant European cruiserweight title
48	Win	41–7	Roy Jones Jr.	KO	4 (12), 1:59	12 Dec 2015	VTB Arena, Moscow, Russia	
47	Win	40–7	Jiri Svacina	TKO	5 (10), 2:00	10 Oct 2015	Newport Centre, Newport, Wales	
46	Win	39–7	Gyorgy Novak	TKO	1 (8), 0:48	14 Mar 2015	Victoria Warehouse, Manchester, England	
45	Loss	38–7	Jürgen Brähmer	RTD	5 (12), 3:00	5 Apr 2014	StadtHalle, Rostock, Germany	For WBA light-heavyweight title
44	Win	38–6	Courtney Fry	TKO	7 (10), 1:46	7 Dec 2013	Echo Arena, Liverpool, England	
43	Win	37–6	Ovill McKenzie	TKO	11 (12), 2:44	17 Aug 2013	Motorpoint Arena, Cardiff, Wales	Won Commonwealth light-heavyweight title
42	Win	36–6	Carl Wild	KO	6 (6), 2:18	20 Apr 2013	Wembley Arena, London, England	
41	Loss	35–6	Ovill McKenzie	TKO	2 (12), 2:15	11 Sep 2012	Liverpool Olympia, Liverpool, England	For Commonwealth light-heavyweight title
40	Win	35–5	Shane McPhilbin	UD	12	23 Mar 2012	Civic Hall, Wolverhampton, England	Won British cruiserweight title
39	Win	34–5	Ciaran Healy	TKO	2 (8), 2:50	25 Feb 2012	Motorpoint Arena, Cardiff, Wales	
38	Win	33–5	Gyorgy Marosi	TKO	1 (8), 1:39	18 Nov 2011	York Hall, London, England	
37	Loss	32–5	Alexander Frenkel	KO	7 (12), 2:30	18 Sep 2010	LG Arena, Birmingham, England	Lost European cruiserweight title
36	Win	32–4	Alexander Kotlobay	TKO	1 (12), 2:15	27 Apr 2010	Yubileiny Sports Palace, Saint Petersburg, Russia	Won European cruiserweight title
35	Win	31–4	Zoltan Czekus	TKO	1 (8), 2:04	12 Mar 2010	Echo Arena, Liverpool, England	
34	Win	30–4	Krisztian Jaksi	KO	1 (6), 1:34	5 Dec 2009	Metro Radio Arena, Newcastle, England	
33	Loss	29–4	Denis Lebedev	TKO	3 (12), 2:20	18 Jul 2009	MEN Arena, Manchester, England	For vacant WBO Inter-Continental cruiserweight title
32	Loss	29–3	Ola Afolabi	KO	9 (12), 1:50	14 Mar 2009	MEN Arena, Manchester, England	For WBO interim cruiserweight title
31	Win	29–2	Matthew Ellis	TKO	2 (10), 1:28	6 Dec 2008	ExCeL, London, England	
30	Loss	28–2	David Haye	TKO	2 (12), 2:04	8 Mar 2008	The O2 Arena, London, England	Lost WBO cruiserweight title; For WBA (Super), WBC, and The Ring cruiserweight titles
29	Win	28–1	Mohamed Azzaoui	TKO	4 (12), 0:58	3 Nov 2007	Millennium Stadium, Cardiff, Wales	Retained WBO cruiserweight title
28	Win	27–1	Wayne Braithwaite	UD	12	21 Jul 2007	International Arena, Cardiff, Wales	Retained WBO cruiserweight title
27	Win	26–1	Bobby Gunn	TKO	1 (12), 2:35	7 Apr 2007	Millennium Stadium, Cardiff, Wales	Retained WBO cruiserweight title
26	Win	25–1	Mark Hobson	TKO	1 (12), 1:11	14 Oct 2006	MEN Arena, Manchester, England	Retained WBO cruiserweight title
25	Win	24–1	Marcelo Domínguez	TKO	9 (12), 0:58	8 Jul 2006	Millennium Stadium, Cardiff, Wales	Won WBO interim cruiserweight title
24	Win	23–1	Mark Hobson	UD	12	4 Mar 2006	MEN Arena, Manchester, England	Retained WBU cruiserweight title
23	Win	22–1	Marco Heinichen	KO	1 (10), 1:38	26 Nov 2005	Palazzetto dello Sport, Rome, Italy	
22	Win	21–1	Roman Bugaj	TKO	1 (8), 1:55	4 Jun 2005	MEN Arena, Manchester, England	
21	Win	20–1	Rich LaMontagne	TKO	4 (12), 1:04	21 Jan 2005	Leisure Centre, Bridgend, Wales	Retained WBU cruiserweight title
20	Win	19–1	Jesper Kristiansen	KO	3 (12), 2:05	3 Sep 2004	Leisure Centre, Newport, Wales	Retained WBU cruiserweight title
19	Win	18–1	Ismail Abdoul	UD	12	3 Jul 2004	Leisure Centre, Newport, Wales	Retained WBU cruiserweight title
18	Win	17–1	Gary Delaney	TKO	8 (12), 2:37	21 Feb 2004	National Ice Rink, Cardiff, Wales	Retained WBU cruiserweight title
17	Win	16–1	Earl Morais	KO	1 (12), 1:30	6 Dec 2003	National Ice Rink, Cardiff, Wales	Retained WBU cruiserweight title
16	Win	15–1	Andrei Karsten	KO	1 (12), 1:10	13 Sep 2003	Leisure Centre, Newport, Wales	Retained WBU cruiserweight title
15	Win	14–1	Bruce Scott	TKO	4 (12), 2:49	18 Jun 2003	International Arena, Cardiff, Wales	Won vacant WBU cruiserweight title
14	Win	13–1	Valeri Semiskur	TKO	1 (12), 1:38	29 Mar 2003	Mountbatten Centre, Portsmouth, England	
13	Win	12–1	Paul Bonson	PTS	4	18 Jan 2003	Guild Hall, Preston, England	
12	Win	11–1	Dave Clarke	TKO	2 (4), 2:38	12 Oct 2002	York Hall, London, England	
11	Win	10–1	Tony Booth	TKO	2 (4), 1:51	17 Aug 2002	Cardiff Castle, Cardiff, Wales	
10	Win	9–1	Tony Booth	PTS	4	20 Apr 2002	International Arena, Cardiff, Wales	
9	Win	8–1	James Gilbert	TKO	2 (6), 2:18	12 Feb 2002	York Hall, London, England	
8	Win	7–1	Kevin Barrett	TKO	2 (6), 2:38	15 Dec 2001	Wembley Conference Centre, London, England	
7	Win	6–1	Eamon Glennon	TKO	2 (4)	9 Oct 2001	National Ice Rink, Cardiff, Wales	
6	Win	5–1	Darren Ashton	KO	1 (4), 1:15	18 Apr 2001	International Arena, Cardiff, Wales	
5	Win	4–1	Chris Woollas	PTS	4	11 Dec 2000	Kingsway Leisure Centre, Widnes, England	
4	Loss	3–1	Lee Swaby	KO	3 (4), 2:35	12 May 2000	Leisure Centre, Swansea, Wales	
3	Win	3–0	Nigel Rafferty	TKO	3 (4), 2:52	26 Feb 2000	Leisure Centre, Swansea, Wales	
2	Win	2–0	Mark Williams	TKO	1 (4), 0:35	11 Dec 1999	Rhydycar Leisure Centre, Merthyr, Wales	
1	Win	1–0	Paul Bonson	PTS	4	2 Oct 1999	International Arena, Cardiff, Wales	

== See also ==
- List of Welsh boxing world champions

Sporting positions
Regional boxing titles
Vacant Title last held by Marco Huck	European cruiserweight champion 27 April 2010 – 18 October 2010	Succeeded by Alexander Frenkel
Preceded by Shane McPhilbin	British cruiserweight champion 23 March 2012 – October 2012; Vacated	Vacant Title next held by Jon-Lewis Dickinson
Preceded by Ovill McKenzie	Commonwealth light-heavyweight champion 17 August 2013 – December 2013; Vacated	Vacant Title next held by Bob Ajisafe
Minor world boxing titles
Vacant Title last held by Sebastiaan Rothmann	WBU cruiserweight champion 28 June 2003 – July 2006; Vacated	Vacant Title next held by Mark Hobson
Major world boxing titles
New title	WBO cruiserweight champion Interim title 8 July 2006 – 22 September 2006; Promoted	Vacant Title next held by Victor Emilio Ramírez
Preceded by Johnny Nelson retired	WBO cruiserweight champion 22 September 2006 – 8 March 2008	Succeeded by David Haye
