= Lee Swaby =

British boxer

Personal information
- Born: 14 May 1976 (age 50) Lincoln, Lincolnshire, England
- Height: 6 ft 2 in (188 cm)
- Weight: Cruiserweight; Heavyweight

Boxing career
- Stance: Southpaw

Boxing record
- Total fights: 56
- Wins: 25
- Win by KO: 11
- Losses: 29
- Draws: 2

Lee Swaby (/ˈsweɪbi/ SWAY-bee; born 14 May 1976) is a British former professional boxer who competed from 1997 to 2010. At regional level, he challenged twice for the British cruiserweight title in 2004 and 2006, and once for the Commonwealth cruiserweight title in 2004. He holds a notable win over future world cruiserweight champion Enzo Maccarinelli.

== Professional career ==
Swaby began his sporting career as a kickboxer aged 14. He trained at the 'Still Kickboxing Gym' in Lincoln city. Swaby's trainer invited him to attend a trial to join the fighters class. This trial involved a meeting with Jack Boas. He was trained by Jez Hall and went on to win titles including National, British, International and World Championships. He competed all over the world including a fight in New Zealand with Ray Sefo, who was four time world champion.

Swaby retired from kickboxing at the age of 20, following the winning of his second world title in his home town of Lincoln. He began a professional boxing career under the management of Nat Basso as a cruiserweight, winning his first professional fight against Naveed Anwar on 29 April 1997 in Manchester. Swaby went on to win his next three fights in his first year as a professional boxer.

In 2000, Swaby came up against Enzo Maccarinelli in his opponents home town of Swansea. Broadcast on the BBC, he knocked Maccarinelli out in the third round.

Swaby went on to fight boxer Tony Dowling also from his home town of Lincoln in Newark's Grove Leisure Centre on 9 September 2000, with Swaby defeating Dowling with a TKO in the ninth round.

In 2001 Swaby's manager, Nat Basso died, leaving him self-managed before Dennis Hobson of Fight Academy managed him after seeing him in sparring sessions with Clinton Woods.

Following several opponents Swaby went up against Mark Hobson in 2002 at Huddersfield Leisure Centre in Yorkshire, in the BBBofC British cruiserweight title eliminator where he lost on points after a 10-round fight. Despite the loss, Swaby went on to win his next six fights only to return to Huddersfield to face Hobson for the Commonwealth cruiserweight title and the BBBofC British Cruiserweight title. He lost through a technical knockout in round six of a twelve-round fight.

Swaby went on to have six more fights before deciding to become a heavyweight boxer in 2007. After a year out of the boxing ring gaining the weight he fought his first heavyweight battle on 7 December 2007 in Germany against unbeaten Sebastian Koeber and went the full six rounds.

In 2008, Swaby competed in the Matchroom sports' Prizefighter heavyweights tournament, which was aired live on Sky Sports on 12 September 2008, at Metro Radio Arena in Newcastle-upon-Tyne. Swaby beat Darren Morgan to take him into the semi-final before being defeated by Chris Burton.

Swaby took on two more short notice fights including Tyson Fury aired on ITV4's 'Fight night' on 14 March 2009, where Fury was seen punching himself in the face following a failed uppercut. Fury beat Swaby after he retired in his corner in the fourth round.

On 9 May 2009, Swaby fought Paul Butlin for the Midlands Area heavyweight title and won. The following year Swaby organised another boxing show on valentines weekend. He fought for the British masters heavyweight title against David Ingleby and won going the full 10 rounds. Swaby lost another 6 fights all at short notice before retiring his career on 22 October 2010.

== Professional boxing record ==
56 fights	25 wins	29 losses
By knockout	11	12
By decision	13	17
By disqualification	1	0
Draws	2	

No.	Result	Record	Opponent	Type	Round, time	Date	Location	Notes
56	Loss	25–29–2	Edmund Gerber	KO	4 (8), 1:35	22 Oct 2010	EKZ "Helle Mitte", Marzahn-Hellersdorf, Germany	
55	Loss	25–28–2	David Howe	PTS	6	9 Oct 2010	Hotel de France, St Helier, Jersey, England	
54	Loss	25–27–2	Matt Skelton	TKO	5 (6), 1:00	9 Jul 2010	York Hall, London, England	
53	Loss	25–26–2	Damien Campbell	PTS	4	2 Jul 2010	Doncaster Dome, Doncaster, England	
52	Loss	25–25–2	Tom Dallas	KO	1 (6), 1:54	14 May 2010	Goresbrook Leisure Centre, Dagenham, England	
51	Loss	25–24–2	Andrzej Wawrzyk	UD	8	20 Mar 2010	Strzelce Opolskie, Poland	
50	Win	25–23–2	David Ingleby	PTS	10	13 Feb 2010	Showground, Lincoln, England	
49	Win	24–23–2	Paul Butlin	PTS	10	9 May 2009	Showground, Lincoln, England	Won vacant Midlands Area heavyweight title
48	Loss	23–23–2	Tyson Fury	RTD	4 (6), 3:00	14 Mar 2009	Aston Events Centre, Birmingham, England	
47	Loss	23–22–2	Derek Chisora	TKO	3 (8), 2:45	26 Sep 2008	York Hall, London, England	
46	Loss	23–21–2	Chris Burton	UD	3	12 Sep 2008	Metro Radio Arena, Newcastle, England	Prizefighter: The Heavyweights II - Semi-final
45	Win	23–20–2	Darren Morgan	UD	3	12 Sep 2008	Metro Radio Arena, Newcastle, England	Prizefighter: The Heavyweights II - Quarter-final
44	Loss	22–20–2	Chris Burton	PTS	8	9 May 2008	Eston Sports Academy, Middlesbrough, England	
43	Loss	22–19–2	David Dolan	PTS	6	8 Feb 2008	Peterlee Leisure Centre, Peterlee, England	
42	Loss	22–18–2	Sebastian Koeber	UD	6	7 Dec 2007	Sporthalle, Alsterdorf, Germany	
41	Loss	22–17–2	Aleksandr Alekseyev	TKO	5 (6), 1:55	2 Dec 2006	Estrel Convention Center, Neukölln, Germany	
40	Loss	22–16–2	John Keeton	TKO	7 (12), 2:29	20 Oct 2006	Don Valley Stadium, Sheffield, England	For vacant British cruiserweight title
39	Loss	22–15–2	Marco Huck	RTD	6 (8), 3:00	4 Mar 2006	EWE-Arena, Oldenburg, Germany	
38	Win	22–14–2	Vitali Shkraba	TKO	3 (4), 1:42	26 Nov 2005	Sheffield Arena, Sheffield, England	
37	Win	21–14–2	Hastings Rasani	PTS	4	9 Sep 2005	Sheffield Arena, Sheffield, England	
36	Win	20–14–2	Denzil Browne	TKO	7 (10), 1:55	24 Oct 2004	Octagon Centre, Sheffield, England	
35	Loss	19–14–2	Mark Hobson	TKO	6 (12), 1:02	27 May 2004	Octagon Centre, Sheffield, England	For British and Commonwealth cruiserweight titles
34	Win	19–13–2	Lee Mountford	TKO	1 (4), 0:25	20 Apr 2004	Huddersfield Sports Centre, Huddersfield, England	
33	Win	18–13–2	Brodie Pearmaine	RTD	4 (4), 3:00	5 Sep 2003	Ponds Forge Arena, Sheffield, England	
32	Win	17–13–2	Paul Bonson	PTS	4	10 Jun 2003	Ponds Forge Arena, Sheffield, England	
31	Win	16–13–2	Tommy Eastwood	PTS	6	24 Jan 2003	Ponds Forge Arena, Sheffield, England	
30	Win	15–13–2	Eamon Glennon	PTS	4	5 Dec 2002	Moat House, Sheffield, England	
29	Win	14–13–2	Greg Scott Briggs	TKO	3 (8), 0:29	3 Aug 2002	Derby Storm Arena, Derby, England	
28	Loss	13–13–2	Mark Hobson	PTS	10	27 Apr 2002	Huddersfield Sports Centre, Huddersfield, England	
27	Win	13–12–2	Chris Woollas	TKO	4 (6), 1:10	15 Dec 2001	Don Valley Stadium, Sheffield, England	
26	Win	12–12–2	Kevin Barrett	PTS	4	13 Sep 2001	Ponds Forge Arena, Sheffield, England	
25	Win	11–12–2	Stephane Allouane	PTS	4	31 Jul 2001	York Hall, London, England	
24	Draw	10–12–2	Denzil Browne	PTS	8	2 Jun 2001	Light Waves Leisure Centre, Wakefield, England	
23	Win	10–12–1	Eamon Glennon	PTS	6	30 Apr 2001	Posthouse Hotel, Glasgow, Scotland	
22	Loss	9–12–1	Crawford Ashley	PTS	8	24 Mar 2001	Ponds Forge Arena, Sheffield, England	
21	Loss	9–11–1	Robert Norton	PTS	8	5 Feb 2001	City Hall, Hull, England	
20	Win	9–10–1	Tony Dowling	KO	9 (10)	9 Sep 2000	Grove Leisure Centre, Newark, England	
19	Loss	8–10–1	Steffen Nielsen	PTS	4	26 May 2000	Holbaek stadionhal, Holbaek, Denmark	
18	Win	8–9–1	Enzo Maccarinelli	KO	3 (6), 2:35	12 May 2000	Leisure Centre, Swansea Wales	
17	Win	7–9–1	Mark Levy	PTS	4	15 Apr 2000	York Hall, London, England	
16	Loss	6–9–1	Kelly Oliver	PTS	10	5 Mar 2000	Bushfield Leisure Centre, Peterborough, Germany	
15	Loss	6–8–1	Owen Beck	PTS	4	11 Dec 1999	Everton Park Sports Centre, Liverpool, England	
14	Draw	6–7–1	Brian Gascoigne	PTS	4	3 Oct 1999	Queens Park Leisure Centre, Chesterfield, England	
13	Loss	6–7	Garry Delaney	PTS	8	4 Sep 1999	York Hall, London, England	
12	Win	6–6	Lee Archer	PTS	6	23 Jun 1999	Gala Baths, West Bromwich, England	
11	Loss	5–6	Mark Levy	RTD	5 (6)	20 Dec 1998	The Willows (Salford RLFC), Salford, England	
10	Loss	5–5	Cathal O'Grady	TKO	1 (6)	19 Sep 1998	National Basketball Arena, Dublin, Ireland	
9	Loss	5–4	Chris P Bacon	PTS	6	17 Jul 1998	Golf and Country Club, Mere, England	
8	Loss	5–3	Chris P Bacon	TKO	3 (4), 1:06	8 May 1998	Bowlers Exhibition Centre, Manchester, England	
7	Loss	5–2	Phil Day	PTS	4	7 Mar 1998	Rivermead Leisure Centre, Reading, England	
6	Win	5–1	John Wilson	KO	3 (6)	27 Feb 1998	Thistle Hotel, Glasgow, Scotland	
5	Loss	4–1	Tim Redman	PTS	6	2 Feb 1998	Old Trafford, Manchester, England	
4	Win	4–0	Lee Williams	PTS	6	17 Nov 1997	Old Trafford, Manchester, England	
3	Win	3–0	Phil Ball	TKO	3 (6), 1:16	30 Oct 1997	Grove Leisure Centre, Newark, England	
2	Win	2–0	Liam Richardson	TKO	4 (6), 1:11	19 Jun 1997	Baths Hall, Scunthorpe, England	
1	Win	1–0	Naveed Anwar	PTS	6	29 Apr 1997	Holiday Inn, Manchester, England	

Sporting positions
Regional boxing titles
Vacant Title last held by Mark Krence	Midlands Area heavyweight champion 9 May 2009 – May 2014; Vacated	Vacant Title next held by Paul Butlin
