= Damian Norris =

Cuban boxer

Personal information
- Nickname: Good Night
- Born: Damien Arnet Espinosa; August 21, 1981 (age 45) Havana, Cuba
- Height: 6 ft 5 in (197 cm)
- Weight: Heavyweight; Cruiserweight

Boxing career
- Reach: 80 in (204 cm)
- Stance: Orthodox

Boxing record
- Total fights: 22
- Wins: 16
- Win by KO: 10
- Losses: 6
- Draws: 0
- No contests: 0

Damien Arnet Espinosa (born August 23, 1981) is a Cuban professional boxer, whose nickname is "Good Night".

== Amateur career ==
He won a light heavyweight silver medal at the 2000 AIBA Junior World Championships held in Hungary.

== Professional career ==
On August 19, 2006, Norris lost to undefeated Chris Arreola. The bout was televised on HBO.

== Professional boxing record ==
16 wins (10 knockouts, 6 decisions), 7 losses (5 knockouts, 2 decisions)
Result	Record	Opponent	Type	Round	Date	Location	Notes
Loss	20-2	(Russia) Aleksandr Alekseyev	TKO	2	11/06/2011	Hamburg, Germany	WBO Asia Pacific cruiserweight title. Referee stopped the bout at 1:50 of the second round.
Win	3-3	(Germany) Mathias Reinhardt	KO	1	09/04/2011	Ravensburg, Germany	Reinhardt knocked out at 2:35 of the first round.
Win	2-10	(Romania) Constantin Trifanov	KO	2	20/11/2010	Westerburg, Germany	Trifanov knocked out at 2:48 of the second round.
Win	9-11	(Armenia) Armen Azizian	TKO	2	02/10/2010	Kitzbuehel, Austria	Referee stopped the bout at 1:15 of the second round.
Loss	3-22-3	(Turkey) Ergin Solmaz	KO	2	28/08/2010	Öschelbronn, Germany	Norris knocked out at 2:41 of the second round.
Win	--	(Albania) Nysret Sopaj	UD	6	04/06/2010	Hattersheim am Main, Germany	
Win	8-0	(Germany) Alex Mogylewski	UD	8	07/06/2008	Hattersheim am Main, Germany	
Win	19-7-1	(United States) Michael Simms	SD	10	07/02/2008	(United States) Sacramento, California, U.S.	
Loss	29-0	(United States) Malik Scott	UD	10	11/12/2007	(United States) Miami, Florida, U.S.	
Win	18-5	(Puerto Rico) Alex Gonzales	SD	6	19/10/2007	(United States) Miami, Florida, U.S.	
Loss	11-3-2	(United States) Jason Gavern	KO	7	22/06/2007	(United States) Wilmington, California, U.S.	Norris knocked out at 1:28 of the seventh round.
Loss	26-4	(United States) Fres Oquendo	TKO	6	02/05/2007	(United States) Miami, Florida, U.S.	Referee stopped the bout at 1:44 of the sixth round.
Win	14-0-1	(United States) Roderick Willis	TKO	3	17/03/2007	(United States) Corpus Christi, Texas, U.S.	Referee stopped the bout at 2:52 of the third round.
Loss	16-0	(United States) Chris Arreola	TKO	4	19/08/2006	(United States) Reno, Nevada, U.S.	Referee stopped the bout at 2:59 of the fourth round.
Win	10-1-2	(United States) Jason Gavern	SD	6	28/06/2006	(United States) San Jose, California, U.S.	
Win	7-0	(United States) Joseph Guzman	KO	3	03/02/2006	(United States) Paradise, Nevada, U.S.	Guzman knocked out at 1:48 of the third round.
Win	9-11-2	(Mexico) Ricardo Arce	TKO	2	10/12/2004	Monterrey, Mexico	Referee stopped the bout at 2:05 of the second round.
Loss	6-0	(Mexico) Ignacio Esparza	DQ	7	24/09/2004	Guadalajara, Mexico	For vacant WBA Fedebol cruiserweight title.
Win	1-0	(Mexico) Iran Rodriguez	PTS	6	14/08/2004	Puerto Vallarta, Mexico	
Win	0-12	(Mexico) Jose Luis Garcia	TKO	3	26/06/2004	Culiacán, Mexico	
Win	8-6-2	(Mexico) Victor Maciel	TKO	1	28/05/2004	Monterrey, Mexico	
Win	0-2	(Mexico) Jacinto Diaz	KO	2	27/03/2004	Tijuana, Mexico	
Win	7-5-2	(Mexico) Victor Maciel	TKO	2	22/11/2003	Tijuana, Mexico	
