= Noel Magee =

Irish boxer (born 1965)

Personal information
- Nationality: Irish
- Born: 16 December 1965 (age 60) Belfast, Northern Ireland
- Weight: light heavyweight

Boxing career

Boxing record
- Total fights: 37
- Wins: 27
- Win by KO: 12
- Losses: 8
- Draws: 2
- No contests: 0

Noel Magee (born 16 December 1965) is an Irish former professional boxer who competed from 1985 to 1997. He held the Commonwealth light heavyweight title in 1995.

== Background ==
Magee grew up in the strongly nationalist Ardoyne area of Belfast and came from a boxing obsessed family. Magee's younger brother Eamonn stated that for his mother "boxing was as important as school". Magee's three brothers were also boxers with two of them, Eamonn and Terry, having careers as professional boxers. His brother, Eamonn, was also a Commonwealth champion.

== Amateur career ==
Magee, like his younger brother Eamonn, boxed to national level for Ireland. The highlight of his short amateur career was in 1985 when, at the age of eighteen, he won the Irish Light Heavyweight Title, defeating a young Steve Collins in the final. Magee again beat Collins later that year in a trial for the international team.

== Professional career ==
Still only 19 years of age, Magee on 22 May 1985, turned professional under the mentorship of Pat Brogan, winning his first fight at the European Sporting Club, Stoke, England, in which Magee knocked out Nigel Prickett.

=== Title fight defeats ===
It was four years before he fought for his title fight when he took on fellow Belfastman Sam Storey in November 1989 for the British Super Middleweight Title, however he lost this fight when the referee stopped the fight in the 9th round. After this loss Noel changed managers and joined the Eastwood stable. Magee went on a winning streak beating his next seven opponents, before he again fought for another this time the British Light Heavyweight Title against Maurice Core in August 1992 but the result was the same, Magee, was stopped in the ninth despite having Core down twice in 3 rounds up going into the 9th. Magee's following fight was also a defeat, this time at the hands of Dariusz Michalczewski for the Vacant IBF Inter-Continental Light Heavyweight Title. Magee also lost his challenge for the European (EBU) Light Heavyweight Title against Fabrice Tiozzo.

=== Commonwealth title victory ===
After this series of title fight defeats, Magee was becoming disillusioned with boxing and had informed his promoter Barney Eastwood that he was considering changing promoters.

The following week Eastwood lined up a fight with the then unbeaten Commonwealth Light Heavyweight Title holder Garry Delaney. The fight took place in May 1995 at the Festival Hall, Basildon, Essex, England. Magee was a huge underdog with the bookies offering odds of 10/1 for a Magee win. Magee made his superior hand and foot speed tell by winning the fight with a stoppage in the seventh to take the only major title belt in his professional career.

Magee lost the first defence of his title to Nicky Piper, and after this Magee lost his will to continue boxing and two years later, after a brief two fight comeback including a loss to Darren Corbett for the Irish Cruiserweight Title, Magee retired from boxing.

== Professional boxing record ==
27 Wins (12 knockouts, 15 decisions), 8 Losses (7 knockout, 1 decision), 2 Draws Archived 4 December 2013 at the Wayback Machine
| Result | Record | Opponent | Type | Round | Date | Location | Notes |
| Loss | 13–1–1 | (United Kingdom) Darren Corbett | KO | 2 | 29 April 1997 | (United Kingdom) Belfast, Northern Ireland | Irish Cruiserweight Title. |
| Win | 10–22–5 | (United Kingdom) John Duckworth | PTS | 6 | 28 January 1997 | (United Kingdom) Belfast, Northern Ireland | |
| Loss | 22–4–2 | (Wales) Nicky Piper | KO | 9 | 30 September 1995 | Cardiff, Wales | Commonwealth/WBO Intercontinental Light Heavyweight Titles. |
| Win | 19–0–1 | (England) Garry Delaney | TKO | 7 | 9 May 1995 | (Essex) Basildon, England | Commonwealth Light Heavyweight Title. |
| Loss | 30–1 | (France) Fabrice Tiozzo | TKO | 4 | 5 March 1995 | Vitrolles, France | EBU Light Heavyweight Title. |
| Win | 4–1–1 | (England) John J. Cooke | PTS | 6 | 21 May 1994 | (United Kingdom) Belfast, Northern Ireland | |
| Win | 10–26–4 | (Wales) John Kaighin | PTS | 6 | 16 October 1993 | (United Kingdom) Belfast, Northern Ireland | |
| Loss | 16–0 | (Germany) Dariusz Michalczewski | TKO | 8 | 22 May 1993 | Aachen, Germany | IBF Intercontinental Light Heavyweight Title. |
| Loss | 9–0–1 | (England) Maurice Core | TKO | 9 | 28 September 1992 | Manchester, England | BBBofC British Light Heavyweight Title. |
| Win | 4–7 | (England) Roger McKenzie | PTS | 8 | 25 April 1992 | (United Kingdom) Belfast, Northern Ireland | |
| Win | 20–4 | (England) Tony Wilson | TKO | 3 | 11 December 1991 | (Republic of Ireland) Dublin, Ireland | |
| Win | 24–13–1 | (United States) Frank Minton | TKO | 3 | 13 November 1991 | (United Kingdom) Belfast, Northern Ireland | Referee stopped the bout at 0:29 of the third round. |
| Win | 6–12–3 | (Wales) Simon Collins | PTS | 8 | 11 May 1991 | (United Kingdom) Belfast, Northern Ireland | |
| Win | 2–1 | (England) Roger McKenzie | PTS | 6 | 12 February 1991 | (United Kingdom) Belfast, Northern Ireland | |
| Win | 10–4 | (England) Johnny Melfah | PTS | 6 | 30 October 1990 | (United Kingdom) Belfast, Northern Ireland | |
| Win | 6–7–2 | (England) Glazz Campbell | PTS | 8 | 15 September 1990 | (United Kingdom) Belfast, Northern Ireland | |
| Loss | 13–1 | (United Kingdom) Sam Storey | TKO | 9 | 29 November 1989 | (United Kingdom) Belfast, Northern Ireland | BBBofC British Super Middleweight Title. |
| Win | 13–5–1 | (England) Paul McCarthy | KO | 2 | 2 October 1989 | Hanley, England | |
| Loss | 15–10 | (Belgium) Yves Monsieur | TKO | 5 | 15 February 1989 | Stoke-on-Trent, England | |
| Draw | 9–1 | (England) Ian Bulloch | PTS | 10 | 15 November 1988 | (Yorkshire) Kingston upon Hull, England | |
| Win | 15–6 | (United States) Mike Brothers | TKO | 6 | 3 May 1988 | Stoke-on-Trent, England | |
| Draw | 29–11–2 | (France) Rufino Angulo | PTS | 8 | 13 February 1988 | Paris, France | |
| Loss | 5–2 | (Suriname) John Held | PTS | 8 | 20 October 1987 | Kingston upon Hull, England | |
| Win | 21–18–4 | (England) Jimmy Ellis | TKO | 6 | 3 August 1987 | Stoke-on-Trent, England | |
| Win | 9–5 | (England) Lennie Howard | TKO | 1 | 24 February 1987 | (Essex) Ilford, England | Referee stopped the bout at 0:37 of the first round. |
| Win | 8–2 | (England) Serg Fame | PTS | 8 | 17 November 1986 | London, England | |
| Win | 21–16–4 | (England) Jimmy Ellis | PTS | 8 | 13 October 1986 | London, England | |
| Win | 16–21 | (England) Geoff Rymer | KO | 1 | 30 May 1986 | Stoke-on-Trent, England | |
| Win | 7–9–2 | (England) Barry Ahmed | TKO | 7 | 23 April 1986 | Stoke-on-Trent, England | |
| Win | 16–44–2 | (Wales) Winston Burnett | PTS | 8 | 5 March 1986 | Stoke-on-Trent, England | |
| Win | 7–8–2 | (England) Barry Ahmed | PTS | 8 | 20 February 1986 | Newcastle upon Tyne, England | |
| Win | 13–15–1 | (Wales) Blaine Logsdon | PTS | 8 | 23 January 1986 | Stoke-on-Trent, England | |
| Win | 15–43–2 | (Wales) Winston Burnett | PTS | 8 | 11 December 1985 | Stoke-on-Trent, England | |
| Win | 15–41–2 | (Wales) Winston Burnett | PTS | 8 | 6 November 1985 | (Cheshire) Nantwich, England | |
| Win | 1–4–1 | (England) Eddie Chatterton | TKO | 1 | 28 October 1985 | Stoke-on-Trent, England | Referee stopped the bout at 1:37 of the first round. |
| Win | 0–5 | (England) Dave Furneaux | TKO | 3 | 12 September 1985 | (Wiltshire) Swindon, England | Referee stopped the bout at 1:45 of the third round. |
| Win | 0–3 | (England) Nigel Prickett | KO | 1 | 22 May 1985 | Stoke-on-Trent, England | Prickett knocked out at 0:42 of the first round. |
