= Aleksandr Alekseyev (boxer) =

Russian boxer (born 1981)

Personal information
- Nationality: Russian
- Born: Aleksandr Vyacheslavovich Alekseyev; 30 April 1981 (age 45) Tashkent, Uzbek SSR, Soviet Union
- Height: 1.88 m (6 ft 2 in)
- Weight: Cruiserweight

Boxing career
- Stance: Southpaw

Boxing record
- Total fights: 28
- Wins: 24
- Win by KO: 20
- Losses: 3
- Draws: 1
Medal record
Men's boxing
Representing Russia
World Amateur Championships
Gold medal – first place	2005 Mianyang	Heavyweight
Silver medal – second place	2003 Bangkok	Heavyweight
European Amateur Championships
Gold medal – first place	2004 Pula	Heavyweight

Aleksandr Vyacheslavovich Alekseyev (Russian: Александр Вячеславович Алексеев, born 30 April 1981 in Tashkent, Uzbek SSR) is a Russian former professional boxer who competed from 2006 to 2013. He challenged for the IBF and the Ring magazine cruiserweight titles in 2013, and WBO interim cruiserweight title in 2009. At regional level, he held the European cruiserweight title in 2012. As an amateur, he won a silver and gold medal at the 2003 and 2005 World Championships; and gold at the 2004 European Championships.

== Amateur ==
Southpaw Alekseyev beat Jaroslavas Jakšto in the final of the World Military championships 2003. He won a silver medal at the 2003 World Amateur Boxing Championships at 201 lbs losing to his nemesis Odlanier Solís.

Alekseyev won the gold medal in the same division at the 2004 European Amateur Boxing Championships in Pula, Croatia.

The participated in the 2004 Summer Olympics. There he was narrowly defeated in the first round of the heavyweight (91 kg) division by Cuba's eventual winner Odlanier Solís.

He won a gold medal at the 2005 World Amateur Boxing Championships after Solís moved up in weight.

=== Amateur highlights ===
- 2002, 2003, 2005 Russian heavyweight champion
- 1999 won the Junior European Championship in Rijeka, Croatia, as a light heavyweight.
- 2002 won the Military World Championship in Curragh (Ireland) as a heavyweight, beating Dieter Roth (Germany) in the final by RSCO-2
- 2003 won the Military World Championship in Catania (Italy), beating Jaroslavas Jakšto (Lithuania) in the final (28–8)
- 2003 2nd place at the World Championships in Bangkok, Thailand. Results were:
  - Defeated Shamsidin Arbobov (Tajikistan) RSCO-2
  - Defeated Raitis Ritenieks (Latvia) walkover
  - Defeated Steffen Kretschmann (Germany) RSCO-3
  - Lost to Odlanier Solís (Cuba) PTS (15–18)
- 2004 won the European Championship in Pula (Croatia), beating Victor Zuyev (Belarus) in the final.
- 2004 competed at the Athens Olympics. Result was:
  - Lost to Odlanier Solís (Cuba) PTS (21–24)
- 2005 won the World Championships in Mianyang, China. Results were:
  - Defeated Brad Pitt (Australia) RSCO
  - Defeated Zhenis Taumurinov (Kazakhstan) RSCO
  - Defeated Jozsef Darmos (Hungary) AB
  - Defeated Alexander Povernov (Germany) PTS (36–33)
  - Defeated Elchin Alizade (Azerbaijan) walkover

== Professional ==
He turned pro in Germany as a cruiserweight in January 2006 and he defeated Tomáš Mrázek with a first-round knockout in his first fight.

Alekseyev won his first 16 pro fights, winning 15 by knockout, before suffering his first loss at the hands of Victor Emilio Ramírez in his 17th pro bout in January 2009.

He was slated to fight Garrett Wilson on 22 February 2013 in Galaţi, Romania, for the IBF cruiserweight title eliminator. Alekseyev won via unanimous decision becoming the mandatory for the IBF world title (currently held by Yoan Pablo Hernández).

The bout with Hernández took place on 23 November 2013 in Germany with the IBF cruiserweight title on the line. Alekseyev lost via tenth-round knockout.

== Professional record ==
24 wins (20 knockouts), 3 losses, 1 draw
Result	Record	Opponent	Type	Round	Date	Location	Notes
Loss	24–3-1	(Cuba) Yoan Pablo Hernández	KO	10 (12)	2013-11-23	(Germany) Bamberg	For IBF and The Ring cruiserweight titles
Win	24–2-1	(United States) Garrett Wilson	UD	12 (12)	2013-02-22	(Romania) Galați	IBF cruiserweight title eliminator
Draw	23–2-1	(Turkey) Firat Arslan	MD	12 (12)	2012-05-11	(Germany) Göppingen	Retained EBU (European) cruiserweight title
Win	23–2	(Serbia) Enad Licina	UD	12 (12)	2012-02-04	(Germany) Frankfurt	Won vacant EBU (European) cruiserweight title
Win	22–2	(South Africa) Daniel Bruwer	TKO	8 (12)	2011-11-18	(Germany) Cuxhaven	Won vacant WBC International cruiserweight title
Win	21–2	(Cuba) Damian Norris	TKO	2 (12)	2011-06-11	(Germany) Hamburg	Won vacant WBO Asia Pacific cruiserweight title
Win	20–2	(United States) DeAndrey Abron	TKO	6 (8)	2011-04-09	(Germany) Hamburg	
Loss	19–2	(Russia) Denis Lebedev	KO	2 (12)	2010-07-17	(Germany) Schwerin	WBO cruiserweight title eliminator
Win	19–1	(Australia) Daniel Ammann	KO	2 (10)	2009-12-19	(Germany) Schwerin	
Win	18–1	(United States) Kendrick Releford	RTD	3 (10)	2009-07-04	(Germany) Hamburg	
Won	17–1	(United States) Max Alexander	UD	10 (10)	2009-05-02	(Germany) Bremen	
Loss	16–1	(Argentina) Victor Emilio Ramírez	RTD	9 (12)	2009-01-17	(Germany) Düsseldorf	For interim WBO cruiserweight title
Won	16–0	(United States) Rob Calloway	TKO	3 (12)	2008-09-27	(Germany) Hamburg	
Won	15–0	(Dominican Republic) Louis Azille	TKO	2 (10)	2008-05-31	(Germany) Düsseldorf	
Won	14–0	(United States) Talmadge Griffis	RTD	3 (12)	2008-02-23	(Germany) Halle, Saxony-Anhalt	
Won	13–0	(Puerto Rico) Francisco Alvarez	TKO	4 (8)	2007-10-31	(Puerto Rico) San José	
Won	12–0	(United States) Darrin Humphrey	TKO	4 (12)	2007-09-15	(Germany) Rostock	
Won	11–0	(Argentina) Héctor Alfredo Ávila	TKO	1 (12)	2007-06-16	(Hungary) Budapest	Won vacant WBO Inter-Continental cruiserweight title
Won	10–0	(United Kingdom) John Anthony	TKO	5 (8)	2007-03-17	(Germany) Stuttgart	
Won	9–0	(Nicaragua) Henry Saenz	TKO	1 (8)	2007-02-27	(Germany) Cuxhaven	
Won	8–0	(United Kingdom) Lee Swaby	TKO	5 (6)	2006-12-02	(Germany) Berlin	
Won	7–0	(Argentina) Luis Oscar Ricail	UD	6 (6)	2006-10-28	(Germany) Stuttgart	
Won	6–0	(Hungary) Adrian Rajkai	TKO	3 (6)	2006-08-22	(Germany) Hamburg	
Won	5–0	(Hungary) Zoltán Béres	TKO	4 (6)	2006-07-25	(Germany) Hamburg	
Won	4–0	(Armenia) Vage Kocharyan	TKO	2 (6)	2006-05-23	(Slovenia) Ptuj	
Won	3–0	(Ukraine) Oleksandr Subin	TKO	1 (4)	2006-04-08	(Germany) Kiel	
Won	2–0	(Russia) Andrey Zaitsev	TKO	2 (4)	2006-03-11	(Germany) Hamburg	
Won	1–0	(Czech Republic) Tomáš Mrázek	TKO	1 (4)	2006-01-07	(Germany) Munich	Professional debut
