= Denis Lebedev =

Russian boxer (born 1979)

Denis Lebedev Денис Лебедев
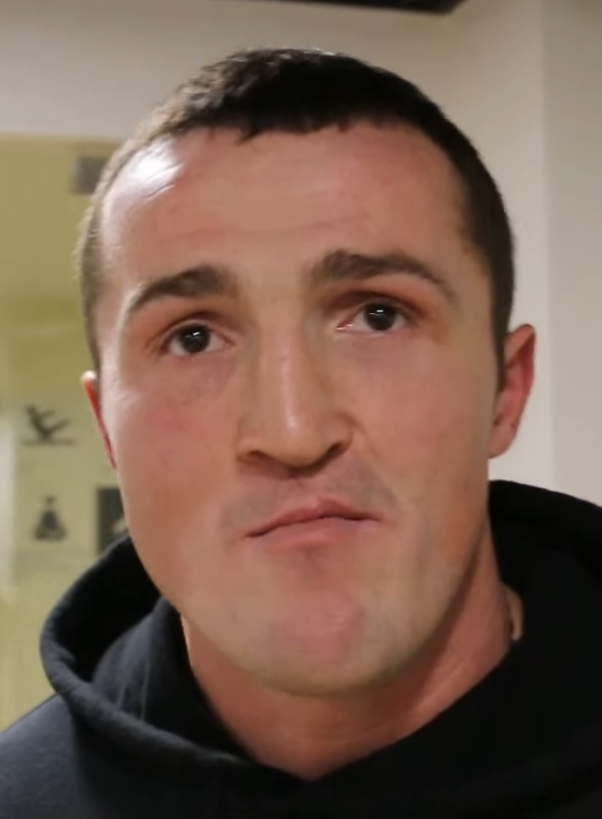
- Lebedev in 2015

Personal information
- Born: Denis Aleksandrovich Lebedev; 14 August 1979 (age 47) Stary Oskol, Russian SFSR, Soviet Union
- Height: 1.80 m (5 ft 11 in)
- Weight: Light-heavyweight; Cruiserweight

Boxing career
- Reach: 182 cm (72 in)
- Stance: Southpaw

Boxing record
- Total fights: 36
- Wins: 32
- Win by KO: 23
- Losses: 3
- No contests: 1

Denis Aleksandrovich Lebedev (Russian: Денис Александрович Лебедев; born 14 August 1979) is a Russian former professional boxer who competed from 2001 to 2019. He was a unified world cruiserweight champion, having held the WBA title from 2012 to 2018, and the IBF title in 2016.

== Professional career ==
=== Early career ===
Lebedev turned pro in 2001. In 2004, Lebedev won the vacant Russian light heavyweight title in a shut out 10-round decision win against Artem Vychkin. Following this victory, Lebedev took four years out and returned in 2009 fighting at cruiserweight.

=== World title challenge ===
In 2009, having a record of 16 wins, 11 by knockout, Lebedev beat Cuban Eliseo Castillo who held a win over Michael Moorer, but was not highly regarded. Lebedev then managed to knockout former WBO titleholder Enzo Maccarinelli. In 2010 he also stopped 2005 amateur world champion Aleksandr Alekseyev by one-punch knockout. This guaranteed him a shot at Marco Huck's WBO title.

==== Lebedev vs. Huck ====
Lebedev challenged Marco Huck for the WBO cruiserweight title on 18 December 2010 at the Max-Schmeling-Halle in Berlin. Lebedev lost by a very controversial split decision, when both the Dutch and Spanish judges had Huck with 115–113 in front, while the US judge scored it 116–112 for Lebedev. Many experts at ringside thought Lebedev had deserved the decision. After the fight, Marco Huck claimed that he was boxing with a broken rib from the 4th round on.

=== Comeback trail ===
==== Lebedev vs. Jones Jr. ====
In February 2011, Lebedev's manager Vladimir Hryunov confirmed that negotiations were taking place for Lebedev to fight former multiple-weight world champion and former pound for pound best Roy Jones Jr. (54–7, 40 KOs) in Moscow. On 24 March, a deal had been agreed which would see Jones earn a $500,000 purse. The fight, a 10-round bout, which was billed as the “Battle of Two Empires” was announced to take place on 22 May at the Krylatskoye Sports Palace in Moscow. 2,000 tickets were reportedly sold on the day of release. The promoters expected a sell out.

Lebedev knocked Jones out with 2 seconds left in their 10-round bout. After round 9, the scorecards read (87–84, 85–86, 90–81). The controversy arose when Lebedev punched Jones, when it was, to some, clear that Jones was not responsive and was out on his feet. The final punch put Jones out cold on the canvas and he did not regain his senses for more than 5 minutes amid active medical help. After the bout, Lebedev said that he had nothing to be sorry about. Referee Steve Smoger was also accused of incompetence because he did not stop the fight even though Jones could no longer defend himself which led to Jones taking unnecessary damage. In a statement following the fight, Smoger said, "I didn't stop the fight because there were only a matter of seconds remaining in the fight and it seemed that Roy was pretending, trying to trick his opponent. He did this repeatedly in the fight. So I thought Jones was doing the same thing here, trying to deceive Lebedev in the final seconds of the fight in order to lure Denis in to land a big punch [which Jones managed to do in the previous round]." Jones, when asked about his feelings on the punch responded "I forgive him".

=== WBA cruiserweight champion ===
==== Lebedev vs. Toney ====
In September, it was reported that Lebedev could next fight one of Roy Jones' old foes, James Toney on 5 November 2011. The fight was rescheduled to take place on 4 November at the Khodynka Ice Palace in Moscow over 12 rounds for the interim WBA cruiserweight title. Lebedev was ranked by the WBA at number 3, while Toney entered at number 4, also being the first time he had fought at cruiserweight since 2003. Although Toney still possessed enough defensive skills, Lebedev dominated the fight from the start winning a lopsided decision with scores of 120–108, 120–108 and 120–108.

==== Lebedev vs. Cox, Silgado ====
Lebedev made his first defence of the interim world title at the Crocus City Hall in Myakinino, Russia, on 4 April 2012 against Shawn Cox. In round 2, Cox threw a straight right hand which missed, and walked into a Lebedev counter power left hook to the head, knocking him out. With this win, Lebedev qualified for a shot at the full WBA world champion Guillermo Jones.

Immediately after the Cox fight, there was plans set up for a fight between Lebedev and former world champion Jean-Marc Mormeck (36–5, 22 KOs) at cruiserweight. On 19 May, Lebedev's manager Vladimir Hryunov stated the fight would likely take place on 21 July 2012 in Paris, France. A week later, the WBA ordered Guillermo Jones to fight Lebedev and the fight with Mormeck did not take place. In July, a deal was confirmed for Lebedev vs. Jones to take place on 20 October at the CSKA Arena in Moscow. The fight was postponed once again and in October, Don King and Vladimir Hryunov met to reach an agreement. Part of the agreement was to let Jones take a voluntary request. In October, Jones was stripped for backing out of his scheduled WBA title defense against challenger Andres Taylor and then refusing to fight Lebedev. WBA named Jones as their 'champion in recess' and Lebedev the full WBA titleholder.

On 16 November, it was announced that Lebedev would fight undefeated Colombian boxer Santander Silgado (23–0, 17 KOs) at the City Hall on 17 December 2012. Silgado started off well but was knocked out for a full ten count in round 4. After the fight, Hryunov stated that Lebedev would next fight at the Madison Square Garden and they would target Eddie Chambers (36–3, 18 KOs). The fight would see Chambers dropping down from heavyweight and making his cruiserweight debut.

==== Lebedev vs. Jones ====
In January 2013, the WBA ordered another purse bid for Lebedev vs. Jones. The purse bid took place on 6 February in Panama. Don King won with a bid of $712,000, more than the $357,000 put down by Hryunov. In March, the fight was finally confirmed to take place on 17 May at the Crocus City Hall in Myakinino, Russia. Lebedev was left with a shocking eye injury after losing his WBA cruiserweight title to Jones. By the end of the bout, he could not see out of the injured eye but two judges had him winning 96–94 while the third had scored the bout 97–93 before he was knocked out in the eleventh round. According to most experts, Jones should have been winning clearly, and the suspicion is that the Russian Federation had fixed the bout. This would also explain the fact that the bout was not stopped, even after Lebedev's eye was grotesquely disfigured. Jones refused to take a post-fight drug test, however the WBA later stated he had taken a test after the fight. Lebedev was taken to the hospital immediately after the fight and according to Hryunov, he was released on 25 May. Two weeks after the fight, Lebedev demanded a rematch with Jones, likely for the Wladimir Klitschko vs. Alexander Povetkin undercard in October. On 7 June, Lebedev and Hryunov parted ways. In a statement, Lebedev said he split for 'personal reasons'. Hryunov's rival Kirill Pchelnikov stepped up his interest in managing Lebedev. Jones was stripped of his title later in the year for failing a drug test for this fight, resulting in Lebedev being reinstated as Champion by the WBA.

The fight was reversed to a no-contest after originally being ruled a TKO. A rematch was planned for 25 April 2014, in Moscow, Russia. After Jones was tested positive for the same substance he was tested for after the first fight, the planned rematch was cancelled.

==== Lebedev vs. Kolodziej, Kalenga ====
After the Jones rematch was cancelled, at the time, Lebedev had not fought in 12 months. Talks began for a title defence against undefeated Polish boxer Paweł Kołodziej (33–0, 18 KOs). In July 2014, Lebedev signed a 3-year deal with powerful promotional company World of Boxing. By the end of July, a fight between Lebedev and Kolodziej for the WBA title was confirmed to take place on 27 September at the Dynamo Palace of Sports in Krylatskoye, Moscow. In round 2, Lebedev floored Kolodziej with a well timed power left hook to the face retaining his WBA cruiserweight title. After the fight, Lebedev said, "I would like to return the favor to one person and that is Marco Huck. In our first fight it was my fault that I [go hard in the final] two rounds. One of the [people in the corner], I will not name him, got me in a corner and said, 'Denis, this is our fight, just stay safe in the last two rounds and we've won.' Then I took things calmly in the last two rounds. That was my mistake."

Lebedev wanted to make a quick return to the ring by November 2014. Krzysztof Włodarczyk (49–3–1, 35 KOs) and Roy Jones Jr. (59–8, 41 KOs) both declared their interest in fighting Lebedev. By October, Lebedev pushed his ring return to 2015. The WBA ordered Lebedev to make a defence against their Interim champion Youri Kalenga (21–1, 14 KOs). Kalenga became Interim champion after defeating former European champion Mateusz Masternak in June 2014. On 16 March, a day before the scheduled purse bids, a deal was reached for Lebedev vs. Kalenga to take place on 10 April at the Luzhniki Palace of Sports in Russia. Both fighters were dropped once each in the fight and went the full 12 round distance. Lebedev claimed the unanimous decision with judges' scores of 116–111, 115–112 and 116–110. Lebedev started the fight the better boxer, however was caught off balance in round 4 following a left hand from Kalenga, which dropped him. He spent the next couple of rounds more cautious and in round 7, landed a punch to Kalenga's jaw dropping him.

==== Lebedev vs. Kayode ====
On 18 August 2015, Ringtv announced that Lebedev would defend his WBA title against undefeated Nigerian boxer and friend Lateef Kayode at the Tatneft Arena in Kazan, Russia on 4 November. Lebedev retained his world title after knocking Kayode down three times in the bout before the fight was eventually stopped by the referee. Kayode started off as the aggressor, however Lebedev was in control throughout the fight. At the time of stoppage, Lebedev was ahead on the scorecard with scores of 69–63, 69–63 and 70–63. After the fight, Lebedev spoke to the media and said, "I'm enjoying the win. Today we said to each other, November 4, we're not friends."

=== Unified cruiserweight champion ===
==== Lebedev vs. Ramírez ====
It was announced that Lebedev would be involved in a cruiserweight unification fight against IBF world champion Victor Emilio Ramírez at the Khodynka Ice Palace in Moscow on 21 May 2016. The fight was supposed to be a co-feature of WBC heavyweight title fight between Wilder and Povetkin, however that fight was cancelled. Ramírez was coming off a split decision draw which saw him retain his IBF title against Ovill McKenzie in 2015. Ramírez became the full IBF champion after Yoan Pablo Hernandez stripped due to inactivity.

After a close, tactical first round, Ramírez started to fight on the front foot at the start of round 2, but saw himself hit the canvas. Ramírez got up and as the fight continued Lebedev began landing power shots with both hands. Ramírez stopped throwing back and turned his back. Lebedev waited for Ramírez to turn back around, then continued unloading until Ramírez dropped his hands. The power shots continued from Lebedev until referee Steve Smoger stopped the fight, although giving Ramírez every chance to get back into the bout. The official time of stoppage was 1:57 of round 2. With this win, Lebedev became the unified WBA Super and IBF world champion Speaking after the fight, Lebedev said, "It's excellent. I knew what he was capable of, and the tactics that my trainers had carefully worked out came good." Ramírez announced on 27 December 2016 that he would be retiring from boxing, thus making this his last professional fight.

==== Lebedev vs. Gassiev ====
It was announced in August 2016, that a fight between Lebedev and unbeaten IBF #1 challenger Murat Gassiev (23–0, 17 KOs) was in the works for November or December. Gassiev became the mandatory challenger by the IBF after knocking out American boxer Jordan Shimmell in a title eliminator bout in May. The fight was set for 3 December at the Khodynka Ice Palace in Moscow. At the official weigh in on 2 December, Lebedev weighed in at 199.7 lbs as Gassiev weighed 198.3 lbs. Lebedev successfully applied for only the IBF title to be at stake as a result, retaining his WBA (Super) title in the process. Lebedev kept the attack up through the 12 rounds as he went on to lose a split decision, losing the IBF title in the process. Two judges scored it 116–112 and 116–111 for Gassiev as the third scored it 114–113 for Lebedev. Lebedev was knocked down in round 5, following a left shot to the body, but managed to beat the count. He immediately changed his style to avoid further punishment to the body. In the post fight interview, Lebedev thought he had done enough to win the fight or at least earn a draw and wanted a rematch.

=== WBA (Super) cruiserweight champion ===
==== Lebedev vs. Flanagan ====
On 5 June 2017, it was announced that a deal had been finalized for Lebedev to defend his WBA 'Super' cruiserweight title against Australian boxer and WBA Oceania cruiserweight champion Mark Flanagan (22–4, 15 KOs), who was ranked number 8 by WBA, in Ekaterinburg, Russia on 10 July. This would be the first time Flanagan would fight outside of Australia and Lebedev's seventh defence of the title. Lebedev knocked Flanagan down in round 9 with a left hook to the body and went on to win a lopsided unanimous decision with the judges scoring the fight 119–108, 120–107 and 119–108 all in his favour. Lebedev used his jab to control the fight, following with his left hooks and was the clear aggressor, unfortunately for him, was unable to stop Flanagan. Although Flanagan showed heart in recovering well, had little chance overcoming the experienced champion, only winning a round on two judges scorecards.

=== Career from 2018 ===
On 1 February 2018, the WBA demoted Lebedev to 'champion in recess' and promoted Cuban Yuniel Dorticos from 'regular' to 'full' champion in order for his WBSS semi final fight with IBF beltholder Murat Gassiev to be a true unification. The WBA stated the winner of the tournament would be mandated to fight Lebedev.

On 21 July, Oleksandr Usyk defeated Murat Gassiev to become the undisputed cruiserweight champion, holding all four major belts. A day later, promoter Andrei Ryabinsky was discussing the possibilities of Lebedev using his status as 'champion in recess' to force a fight with Usyk. However, having dealing with inactivity, mostly due to injuries, the fight would not be ideal right away. In August, according to Russian promotional company RCC Boxing, Lebedev would return to the ring on 7 September in Chelyabinsk. It was said that Lebedev would fight a WBA top 15 ranked boxer. US-based Russian boxer Alexey Zubov (17–1, 9 KOs) called out Lebedev to fight him in September. His promoter Dmitriy Salita said, “Alexey’s skills, size drive and determination make him a big threat in the cruiserweight division. In this fight particularly Alexey is very hungry to break into the scene with the best cruiserweights in the world.” German-based Turkish boxer Hizni Altunkaya (30–2, 17 KOs) was confirmed as Lebedev's opponent in a scheduled 10 round bout at the Traktor Sport Palace. Altunkaya was last seen in action, losing via TKO against a returning Beibut Shumenov for the vacant WBA (Regular) title in July 2018. On 5 September, the WBA ordered for Oleksandr Usyk (15–0, 11 KOs) to start negotiating with Lebedev and gave them until the first week of October 2018 to complete negotiations. At the time, a fight between Usyk and Tony Bellew was being negotiated. Lebedev defeated Altunkaya via 3rd round KO. Lebedev struggled to cut off the ring in the opening round as Altunkaya was able to use his foot movement to avoid any damage. Altunkaya was first dropped in round 2 following a left hand. In round 3, Lebedev connected with a left hand counter which dropped Altunkaya. The referee made the 10 count and the fight was stopped at 1 minute, 2 seconds. For the bout, Lebedev weighed 212 pounds.

==== Lebedev vs. Wilson ====
Matchroom Boxing announced a third annual Monte Carlo Boxing Bonanza show to take place at the Casino de Monte Carlo Salle Medecin on 24 November 2018. Lebedev along with WBA super-flyweight champion Kal Yafai were chosen to co-headline the event. Lebedev's opponent was announced as 35 year old American, former amateur Mike Wilson (19–0, 8 KOs). Lebedev put in a strong and dominant performance to defeat Wilson over 12 rounds via a lopsided decision. The three judges scored the fight 117–111, 119–109 and 119–109 in favour of Lebedev. The experience of Lebedev compared to that of Wilson was the main factor in the fight. Wilson did well and took away a moral victory having heard the final bell. Lebedev was cut near his left eye following a jab in round 2 however his corner men were able to control and stop the blood. Wilson suffered a bloodied nose midway in the fight. Lebedev targeted the nose with his shots, and was able to catch him often. Lebedev showed he could still be competitive and win via decision. After the fight, Lebedev said he wanted to fight undisputed champion Oleksandr Usyk. Eddie Hearn stated Lebedev could come to the UK and fight prospect Lawrence Okolie.

==== Lebedev vs. Mchunu ====
On 21 December 2019, Lebedev, ranked #9 by the WBC at cruiserweight, fought WBC #8 and IBF #15 Thabiso Mchunu in his home country of Russia. Lebedev was widely outpointed by his opponent on all three scorecards, 120–107, 119–108 and 115–112.

In January 2020, Lebedev announced his retirement, this time stating it is final.

== Professional boxing record ==
36 fights	32 wins	3 losses
By knockout	23	0
By decision	9	3
No contests	1	

No.	Result	Record	Opponent	Type	Round, time	Date	Location	Notes
36	Loss	32–3 (1)	Thabiso Mchunu	UD	12	21 Dec 2019	Ivan Yarygin Sports Palace, Krasnoyarsk, Russia	For vacant WBC Silver cruiserweight title
35	Win	32–2 (1)	Mike Wilson	UD	12	24 Nov 2018	Casino de Monte Carlo Salle Medecin, Monte Carlo, Monaco	
34	Win	31–2 (1)	Hizni Altunkaya	KO	3 (10), 1:02	7 Sep 2018	Traktor Sport Palace, Chelyabinsk, Russia	
33	Win	30–2 (1)	Mark Flanagan	UD	12	10 Jul 2017	Palace of Sporting Games, Yekaterinburg, Russia	Retained WBA (Super) cruiserweight title
32	Loss	29–2 (1)	Murat Gassiev	SD	12	3 Dec 2016	Megasport Arena, Moscow, Russia	Lost IBF cruiserweight title
31	Win	29–1 (1)	Victor Emilio Ramírez	TKO	2 (12), 1:57	21 May 2016	Megasport Arena, Moscow, Russia	Retained WBA (Super) cruiserweight title; Won IBF cruiserweight title
30	Win	28–1 (1)	Lateef Kayode	TKO	8 (12), 1:22	4 Nov 2015	TatNeft Arena, Kazan, Russia	Retained WBA cruiserweight title
29	Win	27–1 (1)	Youri Kalenga	UD	12	10 Apr 2015	Luzhniki Palace of Sports, Moscow, Russia	Retained WBA cruiserweight title
28	Win	26–1 (1)	Paweł Kołodziej	TKO	2 (12), 2:08	27 Sep 2014	Krylatskoye Sports Palace, Moscow, Russia	Retained WBA cruiserweight title
27	NC	25–1 (1)	Guillermo Jones	KO	11 (12), 1:54	17 May 2013	Crocus City Hall, Moscow, Russia	WBA cruiserweight title at stake; Originally a KO win for Jones, later ruled an NC after he failed a drug test
26	Win	25–1	Santander Silgado	KO	4 (12), 2:16	17 Dec 2012	Crocus City Hall, Moscow, Russia	Retained WBA cruiserweight title
25	Win	24–1	Shawn Cox	KO	2 (12), 2:40	4 Apr 2012	Crocus City Hall, Moscow, Russia	Retained WBA interim cruiserweight title
24	Win	23–1	James Toney	UD	12	4 Nov 2011	Megasport Arena, Moscow, Russia	Won WBA interim cruiserweight title
23	Win	22–1	Roy Jones Jr.	KO	10 (10), 2:58	21 May 2011	Krylatskoye Sports Palace, Moscow, Russia	
22	Loss	21–1	Marco Huck	SD	12	18 Dec 2010	Max-Schmeling-Halle, Berlin, Germany	For WBO cruiserweight title
21	Win	21–0	Aleksandr Alekseyev	KO	2 (12), 2:43	17 Jul 2010	Sport- und Kongresshalle, Schwerin, Germany	
20	Win	20–0	Ignacio Esparza	KO	4 (12), 2:59	22 Feb 2010	Udmurtia State Circus, Izhevsk, Russia	Retained WBO Inter-Continental cruiserweight title
19	Win	19–0	Ali Ismailov	RTD	6 (12), 3:00	17 Dec 2009	Gladiator Fight Club, Saint Petersburg, Russia	Retained WBO Inter-Continental cruiserweight title
18	Win	18–0	Enzo Maccarinelli	TKO	3 (12), 2:20	18 Jul 2009	MEN Arena, Manchester, England	Won vacant WBO Inter-Continental cruiserweight title
17	Win	17–0	Eliseo Castillo	TKO	5 (8), 2:50	22 Mar 2009	Mashinostroitel, Balashikha, Russia	
16	Win	16–0	Dzmitri Adamovich	TKO	4 (10), 2:19	17 Dec 2008	KRC Arbat, Moscow, Russia	
15	Win	15–0	Nick Okoth	TKO	2 (8), 2:47	6 Sep 2008	MEN Arena, Manchester, England	
14	Win	14–0	Archil Mezvrishvili	KO	1 (8), 1:35	19 Jul 2008	Olimpyskiy Sports Palace, Chekhov, Russia	
13	Win	13–0	Artem Vychkin	UD	10	24 Sep 2004	Ice Sports Palace Sibir, Novosibirsk, Russia	Won vacant Russia light-heavyweight title
12	Win	12–0	Bagrat Makhkamov	TKO	2 (8)	6 Jul 2004	Soviet Wings Sport Palace, Moscow, Russia	
11	Win	11–0	Yevhen Bubylych	UD	8	26 Jun 2004	Soviet Wings Sport Palace, Moscow, Russia	
10	Win	10–0	Siarhei Karanevich	UD	6	29 May 2003	Centr na Tulskoy, Moscow, Russia	
9	Win	9–0	Berry Butler	KO	4 (8), 2:48	15 Mar 2003	Max-Schmeling-Halle, Berlin, Germany	
8	Win	8–0	Dzmitri Yavmenenka	TKO	2 (4)	3 Oct 2002	Casino Conti, Saint Petersburg, Russia	
7	Win	7–0	Roman Babaev	RTD	4 (6), 3:00	10 Sep 2002	Soviet Wings Sport Palace, Moscow, Russia	
6	Win	6–0	Dzmitri Adamovich	KO	5 (8)	23 Apr 2002	Soviet Wings Sport Palace, Moscow, Russia	
5	Win	5–0	Rihsiboy Shamirzaev	TKO	9 (12)	26 Dec 2001	KRC Arbat, Moscow, Russia	Retained Russia light-heavyweight title
4	Win	4–0	Mirzohid Jianbaev	TKO	4 (6)	7 Nov 2001	KRC Arbat, Moscow, Russia	
3	Win	3–0	Nourdine Melikh	TKO	3 (12), 1:50	9 Jun 2001	Druzhba Multipurpose Arena, Moscow, Russia	Won vacant Russia light-heavyweight title
2	Win	2–0	Denis Deryabkin	UD	6	6 Mar 2001	CSKA, Moscow, Russia	
1	Win	1–0	Teymuraz Kekelidze	UD	6	27 Feb 2001	Moscow, Russia	

Sporting positions
Regional boxing titles
Vacant Title last held by Dzhabrail Dzhabrailov	Russia light-heavyweight champion 9 June 2001 – September 2003; Vacated	Vacant Title next held by Dzhabrail Dzhabrailov
Vacant Title last held by Dzhabrail Dzhabrailov	Russia light-heavyweight champion 24 September 2004 – December 2006; Vacated	Vacant Title next held by Andrey Yalunin
Vacant Title last held by Aleksandr Alekseyev	WBO Inter-Continental cruiserweight champion 18 July 2009 – 18 December 2010; Lost bid for world title	Vacant Title next held by Ola Afolabi
World boxing titles
Vacant Title last held by Yoan Pablo Hernández	WBA cruiserweight champion Interim title 4 November 2011 – 30 October 2012; Promoted	Vacant Title next held by Youri Kalenga
Preceded by Guillermo Jones; Demoted	WBA cruiserweight champion 30 October 2012 – 21 May 2016; Promoted	Vacant Title next held by Beibut Shumenov as Regular champion
Vacant Title last held by David Haye as Unified champion	WBA cruiserweight champion Super title 21 May 2016 – 1 February 2018; Status changed	Succeeded by Yuniel Dorticos as Champion
Preceded by Victor Emilio Ramírez	IBF cruiserweight champion 21 May 2016 – 3 December 2016	Succeeded by Murat Gassiev
Honorary boxing titles
Vacant Title last held by Guillermo Jones	WBA cruiserweight champion In recess 1 February 2018 – 30 June 2019; Failed to regain world title	Succeeded by Beibut Shumenov as co-titlist from 31 May 2019
