= Maurice Core =

British boxer and trainer

Personal information
- Nickname: Hard Core
- Nationality: British
- Born: 22 June 1965 (age 61) Manchester, England
- Height: 6 ft 5 in (1.96 m)
- Weight: Light-heavyweight

Boxing career

Boxing record
- Total fights: 18
- Wins: 15
- Win by KO: 9
- Losses: 2
- Draws: 1

Maurice Core (born 22 June 1965) is a British former boxer and now a boxing trainer. He won the British light-heavyweight title in 1992 and went on to fight for the European title.

== Career ==
Born in Manchester, Core started boxing at the Champs Camp gym in Moss Side in 1982, where he was trained by Phil Martin. Core had 65 amateur fights before beginning his professional career. During his time as an amateur he was charged with nine attempted murders and imprisoned in Strangeways Prison; He was later cleared and awarded substantial damages. His first pro fight was a win over Dennis Banton in 1990. He won 9 of his first 10 pro fights, with a drawn fight against Nicky Piper in May 1990.

In September 1992 he fought Noel Magee for the vacant British light-heavyweight title, stopping Magee in the 9th round to take the title. He successfully defended the title in December 1993 against Simon Harris, stopping the Londoner in the 11th round. Martin's death from cancer in April 1994 deeply affected Core. He went on to challenge Fabrice Tiozzo for the European title but was stopped in the fourth round — Core's first defeat as a pro. Core moved on to work with Jimmy Tibbs for his last few fights, beating Eric French and Frank Minton in 1995 before his final fight, a loss to Mark Prince in July 1996.

After retiring from boxing he became a trainer at the Moss Side gym where he had learned his trade, going on to work with fighters such as Carl Thompson, Michael Jones, Prince Naseem Hamed and Michael Katsidis.
