= Ignacio Esparza =

Mexican boxer (born 1994)

Personal information
- Nickname: Nach
- Born: Ignacio Esparza; 21 May 1994 (age 32) Guadalajara, Jalisco, Mexico
- Height: 5 ft 10 in (1.78 m)
- Weight: Heavyweight; Cruiserweight

Boxing career
- Reach: 77 in (195 cm)
- Stance: Orthodox

Boxing record
- Total fights: 25
- Wins: 22
- Win by KO: 14
- Losses: 3
- Draws: 0
- No contests: 0

Ignacio Esparza Nach (born 21 May 1994) is a Mexican professional boxer.

== Professional career ==
In September 2014, Ignacio upset an undefeated Damian Norris to win the WBA Fedebol cruiserweight Championship.

On 27 June 2019 he lost a twelve-round decision to IBF Inter-Continental champion Enad Licina; this bout was televised on a Showtime boxing card.

On October 23, 2020 Esparza beat the veteran Javier Polanco at the Explanada "El Grullo" in El Grullo, Jalisco, Mexico.

== Professional boxing record ==
17 Wins (13 knockouts, 4 decisions), 3 Losses (2 knockout, 1 decision)
| Result | Record | Opponent | Type | Round | Date | Location | Notes |
| Loss | 13-0 | (Canada) Simon Kean | KO | 5 | 07/04/2018 | Canada Centre Videotron, Quebec City | For IBO Inter-Continental heavyweight title |
| Win | 29-12 | (Jamaica) Owen Beck | MD | 10 | 29/10/2016 | (Mexico) Coliseo Olimpico de la UG, Guadalajara | |
| Win | -- | (Mexico) Miguel Ángel Flores | KO | 1 | 27/06/2015 | (Mexico) Coliseo Olimpico de la UG, Guadalajara | |
| Win | 3-0 | (Mexico) Denis Reyes | UD | 8 | 23/10/2013 | (Mexico) Salón de Usos Múltiples, El Grullo | |
| Win | 5-2 | (Mexico) Antonio Duarte | UD | 8 | 25/05/2013 | (Mexico) Auditorio Municipal, Tapalpa | |
| Win | -- | (Mexico) Javier Polanco | KO | 1 | 23/10/2010 | (Mexico) El Grullo Esplanade, El Grullo, Jalisco | Polanco knocked out at 1:41 of the first round. |
| Loss | 19-0 | (Russia) Denis Lebedev | KO | 4 | 22/02/2010 | (Russia) Udmurtia Circus, Izhevsk | WBO Intercontinental cruiserweight title. Esparza knocked out at 2:59 of the fourth round. |
| Win | 4-2-1 | (Mexico) Victor Palacios | TKO | 1 | 20/11/2009 | (Mexico) Arena Coliseo, Guadalajara, Jalisco | Referee stopped the bout at 2:34 of the first round. |
| Loss | 16-1 | (Serbia) Enad Licina | UD | 12 | 27/06/2009 | (Germany) Max-Schmeling-Halle, Prenzlauer Berg, Berlin | IBF Intercontinental cruiserweight title |
| Win | 12-19-2 | (Mexico) Ricardo Arce | KO | 1 | 05/12/2008 | (Mexico) Arena Jalisco, Guadalajara, Jalisco | Arce knocked out at 2:52 of the first round. |
| Win | -- | (Mexico) Miguel Gutierrez | UD | 8 | 23/11/2007 | (Mexico) Estadio Jalisco, Guadalajara, Jalisco | |
| Win | 0-2 | (Mexico) Oscar Avila | KO | 2 | 02/02/2007 | (Mexico) Arena Jalisco, Guadalajara, Jalisco | Avila knocked out at 1:20 of the second round. |
| Win | 11-13-2 | (Mexico) Ricardo Arce | UD | 6 | 17/06/2006 | (Mexico) Auditorio Fausto Gutierrez Moreno, Tijuana, Baja California | |
| Win | 17-24-3 | (Mexico) Eduardo "Guina" Ayala | UD | 10 | 25/03/2006 | (Mexico) El Domo del Code Jalisco, Guadalajara, Jalisco | |
| Win | 11-12 | (Mexico) Mario Maciel | TKO | 5 | 24/02/2006 | (Mexico) Arena Coliseo, Guadalajara, Jalisco | |
| Win | -- | (Mexico) José Concepción | TKO | 1 | 02/12/2005 | (Mexico) Guadalajara, Jalisco | Mexico cruiserweight title |
| Win | -- | (Mexico) Juan Carlos Martínez | KO | 1 | 17/06/2005 | (Mexico) Arena Coliseo, Guadalajara, Jalisco | Martinez knocked out at 2:59 of the first round. |
| Win | 5-0 | (Cuba) Damian Norris | DQ | 7 | 24/09/2004 | (Mexico) Arena Coliseo, Guadalajara, Jalisco | WBA Fedebol cruiserweight title |
| Win | 11-11 | (Mexico) Mario Maciel | KO | 5 | 15/05/2004 | (Mexico) Arena Jalisco, Guadalajara, Jalisco | Maciel knocked out at 1:24 of the fifth round. |
| Win | 0-1 | (Mexico) Miguel Carrillo Ruiz | KO | 2 | 13/03/2004 | (Mexico) Guadalajara, Jalisco | Mexican Pacific Coast heavyweight title |
| Win | -- | José Corrales | KO | 3 | 25/10/2003 | (Mexico) Arena Jalisco, Guadalajara, Jalisco | |
| Win | 0-1 | (Mexico) Jorge Arellano | TKO | 5 | 12/07/2003 | (Mexico) Arena Jalisco, Guadalajara, Jalisco | |
| Win | 0-1 | (Mexico) Hugo Lomeli | KO | 5 | 17/07/2000 | (Mexico) | |
| Win | -- | (Mexico) Jesús Mena | KO | 1 | 02/06/2000 | (Mexico) Apatzingán, Michoacán | |
