= Steve Smoger =

American boxing referee (1943–2022)

- Born: August 15, 1943; Norfolk, Virginia, U.S.
- Died: December 19, 2022 (aged 79); Atlantic City, New Jersey, U.S.
- Other name: Double S
- Occupations: Boxing and kickboxing referee, Municipal Court judge

Steve Smoger (August 15, 1943 – December 19, 2022) was an American boxing referee from Atlantic City, New Jersey. He refereed more than 200 title bouts, and was one of the more well-traveled of his profession, holding the distinction of officiating in more states and countries than any other boxing referee in the history of the sport.

Smoger also officiated kickboxing matches.

== Background ==
Raised in Atlantic City, New Jersey, Smoger graduated from Atlantic City High School. He attended Pennsylvania State University and the George Washington University Law School.

Appointed in 1980, Smoger was the first full-time city prosecutor in the history of Atlantic City, serving in that position until 1992, when he was appointed to the bench of the Atlantic County Municipal Court.

From 2002 to 2005, Smoger held the position of City Solicitor of Atlantic City. In 2005, he entered the private practice of law.

Smoger served as a member of the New Jersey Air National Guard and the United States Air Force Reserve. He held the position of Staff Judge Advocate and obtained the rank of colonel. He retired after 30 years of service.

On September 23, 1982, in New Jersey Smoger was first licensed as a professional boxing referee by then Commissioner Jersey Joe Walcott. The happening marked the 30th Anniversary of Jersey Joe Walcott vs. Rocky Marciano for the undisputed heavyweight championship of the World held on September 23, 1952, in Philadelphia, Pennsylvania.

In August 2017, he was appointed the IBA Boxing Officials Committee co-chair.

== Achievements ==
Smoger is a member of the New Jersey Boxing Hall of Fame – Class of 1997. In 2001, he was designated the World's Best Professional Boxing Referee by The Ring magazine. In 2010, he was recognized by the World Boxing Association as Referee of the Year. In 2013 he was recognized by the International Boxing Association as the Referee of the Year.

Smoger is also a member of the Pennsylvania Boxing Hall of Fame – Class of 2013, as well as a member of the Philadelphia Sports Hall of Fame - class of 2014.

On June 14, 2015, Smoger received the highest honor in the sport of professional boxing when he was inducted into the International Boxing Hall Of Fame, Class of 2015, in Canastota, New York.

On May 27, 2017, in Atlantic City, Smoger became the first professional boxing referee to be inducted into the newly created Atlantic City Boxing Hall of Fame, joining Don King and Michael Spinks among other inductees.

== Notable fights ==
Smoger officiated the bouts featuring such professional boxers as Mike Tyson, Lennox Lewis, Larry Holmes, Evander Holyfield, Ray Mercer, Steve Cunningham, John Ruiz, Roberto Durán, Hector Camacho, Roy Jones Jr., James Toney, Mike McCallum, Vinny Pazienza, Floyd Mayweather Jr., Marcos Maidana, Félix Trinidad, Micky Ward, Arturo Gatti, Miguel Cotto, Zab Judah, Shane Mosley, Vernon Forrest, Diego Corrales, Kelly Pavlik, Andre Ward, Gennady Golovkin, Sergey Kovalev, Denis Lebedev, Bernard Hopkins, Lucia Rijker, Christy Martin, as well as a host of Philadelphia fighters including Gabe Rosado, Danny García, among others.

The list of notable bouts Smoger officiated includes:

- Shane Mosley vs. Vernon Forrest I
- Bernard Hopkins vs. Félix Trinidad
- Jermain Taylor vs. Kelly Pavlik I
- Roy Jones Jr. vs. Bernard Hopkins
- Micky Ward vs. Emanuel Burton I - 2001 Ring magazine Fight of the Year.
- Andre Ward vs. Carl Froch - Super Six World Boxing Classic Final.
- Miguel Cotto vs. Antonio Margarito II

== Officiating Kickboxing ==
In 2014, the World Kickboxing Network recognized Smoger as a qualified referee in kickboxing. On November 14, 2014, he made his debut at kickboxing tournament Girl Power held live on Pay-Per-View in Liepaja, Latvia.

On March 10, 2017, Smoger was expected to officiate the first kickboxing World Cup held in Tehran, Iran.

From February 10, 2017, he officiated the bouts at the women's kickboxing series Girl Power live on SFR Sport 5.

== Television appearances ==
Smoger appeared on numerous television shows and networks including ESPN's Friday Night Fights, Bigger's Better Boxing on Eurosport, HBO's Boxing After Dark, ESPN Top Rank Boxing, Tuesday Night Fights, among others.

In 2015, Smoger served as official Rules Consultant for the Premier Boxing Champions Program on NBC. The same year he has also appeared in Ali: Icon, Activist, Fighter documentary short dedicated to Muhammad Ali.
