= Moat House =

Moat House is a name for several houses in the United Kingdom, including:

- Moat House, Britford
- Moat House, Sutton Coldfield
- Moat House, Tamworth
- Moat House, Willenhall
