= Nicky Piper =

Welsh boxer (born 1966)

Personal information
- Nickname: The KO King
- Nationality: Welsh
- Born: Nicholas Piper; 5 May 1966 (age 60) Cardiff, Wales
- Height: 6 ft 3 in (191 cm)
- Weight: Super Middleweight; Light Heavyweight

Boxing career

Boxing record
- Total fights: 33
- Wins: 26
- Win by KO: 20
- Losses: 5
- Draws: 2

Nicky Piper MBE (born 5 May 1966) is a retired Welsh super middleweight and light heavyweight boxer from Culverhouse Cross, Cardiff. His career was at its peak in the 1990s; he became the Commonwealth Light-heavyweight champion in 1995. He was trained by Charlie Pearson and managed by Frank Warren. Since retiring from boxing, Piper has become a notable administrator in British boxing and currently works for The City Hospice as their Corporate Partnerships Manager.

== Boxing career ==
Piper's first professional fight is recorded as being against fellow Welshman Kevin Roper. Piper won the match in the second round via a knockout. Piper then won nine of his next ten encounters, all scheduled for either six or eight rounds. Of the ten bouts, only one, against future British Heavyweight champion Maurice Core, went the full distance, resulting in a draw. Piper stopped his other nine opponents through retirement, knockout, or technical knockout. Piper's first professional loss was to future World Cruiserweight Champion Carl Thompson at York Hall on 4 September 1991, Piper being stopped by technical knockout in the third round. The next month, Piper was back in the ring, beating Franky Moro in a contest at the Royal Albert Hall. He completed 1991 with a sixth-round knockout over Carlos Christie.

Piper won his first three fights of 1992, all on points decisions, the first of which, over Frank Eubank, was an eliminator for the British Super Middleweight title. Another eliminator for the Super Middleweight belt saw Piper stop Johhny Melfah by technical knockout in the fifth at the G-Mex centre in Manchester. Piper's next fight was against WBC Super Middleweight champion Nigel Benn, in a challenge for the title. The twelve-round contest was held at the Alexandra Palace in London on 12 December 1992. Benn stopped Piper in the eleventh round on a technical knockout.

Despite the loss to Benn, Piper's very next match was another title fight; this time for the vacant WBA Inter-Continental light heavyweight belt. The fight against Argentinean Miguel Angel Maldonando went the distance, with Piper being given the title by unanimous points decision. Two months later, on 10 April 1993, Piper successfully defended his title against Chris Sande in Swansea. Piper completed the year with a victory over Trevor Ambrose, and a drawn match with Frank Rhodes. Piper started 1994 with a challenge for the WBO Light-heavyweight title, then held by Leeonzer Barber. Piper failed in his bid when he was again stopped by technical knockout, this time in the ninth round. Piper fought twice more in 1994, a win over Charles Oliver, and a failed bid for the vacant Commonwealth Light-heavyweight title, where he was beaten by Crawford Ashley.

Piper's next fight was a win in an uneven contest against American Tim Bryan in June 1995, followed by a victory over John Keeton, both fights held in Cardiff. Then, on 30 September, he faced Noel Magee for the Commonwealth Light-Heavyweight title. Held at the Cardiff Arms Park, the fight lasted until the ninth round, when Magee was knocked out, giving Piper his most senior belt of his career. In 1996, Piper fought in two bouts: a win over Danny Juma in Cardiff, and a successful defence of his Commonwealth belt to Bruce Scott at Tylorstown. The following year saw Piper's final two fights. In June he defeated Stephane Nizard in Norwich, before a title attempt for the WBO Light-heavyweight against Dariusz Michalczewski in Hanover. Piper was retired by his corner after the seventh round and soon after retired from boxing.

== Professional boxing record ==
26 Wins (21 knockouts, 5 decisions), 5 Losses (4 knockouts, 1 decision), 2 Draws
Result	Record	Opponent	Type	Round	Date	Location	Notes
Loss	34–0	(Poland) Dariusz Michalczewski	TKO	7	4 October 1997	, Hanover, Germany	WBO Light Heavyweight Title. Referee stopped the bout at 3:00 of the seventh round.
Win	19–12–4	(France) Stephane Nizard	PTS	8	28 June 1997	(United Kingdom) , Norwich, England	
Win	18–1	(United Kingdom) Bruce Scott	TKO	7	30 November 1996	(United Kingdom) , Tylorstown, Wales	Commonwealth Light Heavyweight Title.
Win	2–5–1	(United Kingdom) Danny Juma	TKO	2	26 April 1996	(United Kingdom) Welsh Institute of Sport, Cardiff, Wales	
Win	26–6–2	(Northern Ireland) Noel Magee	KO	9	30 September 1995	(United Kingdom) Cardiff Arms Park, Cardiff, Wales	WBO Intercontinental/Commonwealth Light Heavyweight Titles.
Win	9–6	(United Kingdom) John Keeton	RTD	2	7 July 1995	(United Kingdom) Wales National Ice Rink, Cardiff, Wales	Keeton retired at 3:00 of the second round.
Win	22–12–2	(United States) Tim Bryan	TKO	1	17 June 1995	(United Kingdom) Wales National Ice Rink, Cardiff, Wales	Referee stopped the bout at 1:15 of the first round.
Loss	18–6–1	(United Kingdom) Crawford Ashley	PTS	12	19 November 1994	(United Kingdom) Wales National Ice Rink, Cardiff, Wales	Commonwealth Light Heavyweight Title.
Win	14–1–1	(United Kingdom) Charles Oliver	TKO	5	21 September 1994	(United Kingdom) Star Centre, Cardiff, Wales	
Loss	18–1	(United States) Leeonzer Barber	TKO	9	29 January 1994	(United Kingdom) Wales National Ice Rink, Cardiff, Wales	WBO Light Heavyweight Title. Referee stopped the bout at 1:40 of the ninth round.
Draw	9–1–1	(United States) Frank Rhodes	PTS	8	23 October 1993	(United Kingdom) Wales National Ice Rink, Cardiff, Wales	
Win	9–7	(United Kingdom) Trevor Ambrose	TKO	5	10 July 1993	(United Kingdom) Wales National Ice Rink, Cardiff, Wales	
Win	15–4	(Kenya) Chris Sande	TKO	9	10 April 1993	(United Kingdom) Swansea, Wales	WBA Intercontinental Light Heavyweight Title.
Win	30–19–8	(Argentina) Miguel Angel Maldonado	UD	12	13 February 1993	(United Kingdom) Free Trade Hall, Manchester, England	WBA Intercontinental Light Heavyweight Title.
Loss	34–2	(United Kingdom) Nigel Benn	TKO	11	12 December 1992	(United Kingdom) Alexandra Palace, London, England	WBC Super Middleweight Title. Referee stopped the bout at 1:44 of the 11th round.
Win	13–9	(United Kingdom) Johnny Melfah	TKO	5	25 July 1992	(United Kingdom) G-Mex Leisure Centre, Manchester, England	
Win	10–6	(United States) Larry Prather	PTS	8	16 May 1992	Alexandra Pavilion, London, England, United Kingdom	
Win	22–7–1	(United States) Ron Amundsen	PTS	10	11 March 1992	(United Kingdom) Star Centre, Cardiff, Wales	
Win	9–5	(United Kingdom) Frank Eubank	PTS	10	22 January 1992	(United Kingdom) Star Centre, Cardiff, Wales	
Win	8–6	(United Kingdom) Carlos Christie	KO	6	20 November 1991	(United Kingdom) Star Centre, Cardiff, Wales	
Win	13–36–2	(Ghana) Franky Moro	TKO	4	29 October 1991	(United Kingdom) Royal Albert Hall, London, England	
Loss	9–3	(United Kingdom) Carl Thompson	TKO	3	4 September 1991	(United Kingdom) York Hall, London, England	
Win	11–2	(United Kingdom) Simon Harris	TKO	1	3 July 1991	(United Kingdom) , Reading, Berkshire, England	
Win	3–3	(Mexico) Martin Lopez	KO	1	22 May 1991	(United Kingdom) New London Arena, London, England	
Win	11–18–6	(Guadeloupe) Serge Bolivard	TKO	1	8 May 1991	(United Kingdom) New London Arena, London, England	
Win	8–20–3	(Suriname) John Held	TKO	3	5 March 1991	(United Kingdom) New London Arena, London, England	
Win	3–2–2	(United Kingdom) John Ellis	KO	1	12 November 1990	(United Kingdom) s, Norwich, England	Ellis knocked out at 0:12 of the first round.
Win	16–7–1	(United Kingdom) Paul McCarthy	TKO	3	23 October 1990	(United Kingdom) Granby Halls, Leicester, England	
Draw	2–0	(United Kingdom) Maurice Core	PTS	6	22 May 1990	City Hall, Saint Albans, United Kingdom	
Win	5–14	(United Kingdom) Darren McKenna	RTD	4	17 April 1990	(United Kingdom) New London Arena, London, England	McKenna retired at 2:00 of the fourth round.
Win	16–15–4	(United Kingdom) Dave Owens	KO	1	19 December 1989	(United Kingdom) Ocean Rooms, Gorleston, England	
Win	2–7	(United Kingdom) Gus Mendes	TKO	3	17 October 1989	(United Kingdom) Star Centre, Cardiff, Wales	
Win	4–10–1	(United Kingdom) Kevin Roper	KO	2	6 September 1989	(United Kingdom) Afan Lido, Port Talbot, Wales	Roper knocked out at 1:30 of the second round.

== Personal history ==
After his retirement from boxing, Piper became a sports commentator, primarily working for Sky Sports, and in 1997 a member of the British Boxing Board of Control. Piper served as Chairman of the Professional Boxing Association, and in 2005 he was awarded the MBE for his services to the sport. Piper is a member of Mensa, and currently works for The City Hospice (formerly George Thomas Hospice Care) as their Corporate Partnership Manager.

Achievements
Vacant Title last held by Gary Delaney	WBO Intercontinental Light Heavyweight Champion; 30 September 1995 – 4 October 1997; Lost bid for world title	Vacant Title next held by Mark Prince
Preceded by Noel Magee	Commonwealth Light Heavyweight Champion; 30 September 1995 – 4 October 1997; Retired	Vacant Title next held by Crawford Ashley
