= Bruce Scott (boxer) =

English boxer (born 1969)

Personal information
- Nickname: Lionheart
- Nationality: Jamaican; British
- Born: 16 August 1969 (age 57) Jamaica
- Height: 5 ft 9 1/2 in (1.77 m)
- Weight: Light heavyweight; Cruiserweight

Boxing career
- Stance: Orthodox

Boxing record
- Total fights: 37
- Wins: 27
- Win by KO: 18
- Losses: 10

Bruce Scott (born 16 August 1969) is a Jamaican-born British former professional boxer who competed from 1991 to 2009. He challenged twice for cruiserweight world championships in 1999; the WBO and WBC titles. At regional level, he held the British and Commonwealth cruiserweight titles twice between 1998 and 2001.
