= Yunier Dorticos vs. Dmitry Kudryashov =

Boxing match

- Date: September 23, 2017
- Venue: Alamodome, San Antonio, Texas, U.S.
- Title(s) on the line: WBA (Regular) cruiserweight title

Tale of the tape
| Boxer | (Cuba) Yunier Dorticos | (Russia) Dmitry Kudryashov |
| Nickname | "The KO Doctor" | "The Russian Hammer" |
| Hometown | Havana, La Habana, Cuba | Volgodonsk, Rostov Oblast, Russia |
| Pre-fight record | 21–0 (20 KO) | 21–1 (21 KO) |
| Age | 31 years, 6 months | 31 years, 10 months |
| Height | 6 ft 3 in (191 cm) | 6 ft 2 1/2 in (189 cm) |
| Weight | 199 lb (90 kg) | 200 lb (91 kg) |
| Style | Orthodox | Orthodox |
| Recognition | WBA (Regular); Cruiserweight Champion; TBRB; No. 9 Ranked Cruiserweight | WBA; No. 6 Ranked Cruiserweight; TBRB; No. 10 Ranked Cruiserweight |

Result
- Dorticos defeated Kudryashov via 2nd round KO

Yunier Dorticos vs. Dmitry Kudryashov was a professional boxing match contested on September 23, 2017, for the WBA (Regular) cruiserweight championship.

== Background ==
After becoming the mandatory to the WBA's champion Denis Lebedev following a win over Fulgencio Zúñiga, WBA allowed Lebedev to unify against IBF title-holder Victor Emilio Ramírez before facing Dorticos. In turn, the WBA ordered Dorticos to fight Youri Kalenga for an "interim" title. Dorticos would stop Kalenga in the tenth round via technical knockout.

Following this victory, Dorticos entered a purse bid for a fight against WBA (Regular) champion Beibut Shumenov. The fight was delayed several times, due to promotional issues before being called off due to an eye injury that Shumenov suffered during sparring. In June 2017, Shumenov vacated his title due to that same injury. The WBA elevated Dorticos from interim champion to regular champion, despite Dorticos being away from the ring for over a year.

A day after being elevated to Regular champion, Dorticos joined the World Boxing Super Series. The field included 3 of 4 major title-holders from the 4 major sanctioning bodies, with only WBA (Super) champion Denis Lebedev not present. Dorticos was revealed to be the tournament's 4th seed. The bookmakers had him is the third favourite the tournament. At the WBSS draft Gala, held at the Grimaldi Forum in Monaco on 8 July 2017, Dorticos was drawn against unbeaten Russian Dmitry Kudryashov. It was set for September 23 in San Antonio, Texas and was the to be the second cruiserweight quarter final after the Oleksandr Usyk vs. Marco Huck bout two weeks earlier, as well as the Super Series' first match in the United States and the third overall.

The match up generated some excitement, as Kudryashov and Dorticos were both known as knockout punchers, with 42 out of 43 of their combined previous fights ending by way of knockout. A percentage of the gate revenue was donated to the San Antonio Food Bank to aid victims of Hurricane Harvey.

At the official weigh-in, Dmitry Kudryashov initially missed weight by half a pound, coming in at 200 1/2 lbs. However, he was able to come in at exactly 200 lbs in a second try 45 minutes later. Dorticos weighed in at 199 lbs.

== The fight ==
The fight started with a slow-paced, feel out round, with both boxers studying their opponent. Dorticos successfully executed a pull counter as the bell sounded. In round 2, the pace of the fight increased, with Dorticos and Kudryashov trading combinations. Eventually, Dorticos gained the upper hand by landing a series of one-two combos, as Kudryashov retreated behind his high guard. Dorticos ended the contest by knocking out Kudryashov with a right hook. The referee waived the count with a minute left in round 2.

== Aftermath ==
With the win, Dorticos progressed to the semi-final stage of the Super Series and was to face the winner of the Murat Gassiev vs. Krzysztof Włodarczyk quarter final, scheduled for 21 October 2017.

== Undercard ==
Confirmed bouts:

== Broadcasting ==
| Country | Broadcaster |
|---|---|
| Baltic & Nordic countries | Viasat |
| Belgium | VOO |
| Bulgaria | Nova |
| Canada | Super Channel |
| Germany | SAT.1 |
| Russia | Match! Boets |
| Singapore | StarHub |
| Sub-Saharan Africa | TVMS |
| Turkey | Tivibu Sports |
| United Kingdom | ITV |
| Ukraine | Inter |

| Preceded by vs. Youri Kalenga | Yunier Dorticos's bouts 23 September 2017 | Succeeded by vs. Murat Gassiev |
| Preceded by vs. Olanrewaju Durodola | Dmitry Kudryashov's bouts 23 September 2017 | Succeeded by vs. Mauricio Barragan |
