= Murat Gassiev vs. Yuniel Dorticos =

Boxing match

- Date: 3 February 2018
- Venue: Bolshoy Ice Dome, Sochi, Southern Federal District, Russia
- Title(s) on the line: WBA and IBF cruiserweight titles

Tale of the tape
Boxer	(Russia) Murat Gassiev	(Cuba) Yuniel Dorticos
Nickname	"Iron"	"The KO Doctor"
Hometown	Vladikavkaz, North Caucasian, Russia	Havana, La Habana, Cuba
Pre-fight record	25–0 (1) (19 KO)	22–0 (21 KO)
Age	24 years, 3 months	32 years, 3 months
Height	6 ft 4 in (193 cm)	6 ft 3 in (191 cm)
Weight	199 lb (90 kg)	200 lb (91 kg)
Style	Orthodox	Orthodox
Recognition	IBF; Cruiserweight Champion; The Ring/TBRB; No. 2 Ranked Cruiserweight	WBA; Cruiserweight Champion; The Ring; No. 5 Ranked Cruiserweight; TBRB; No. 7 Ranked Cruiserweight

Result
- Gassiev defeats Dorticos in the 12th round via TKO

Murat Gassiev vs. Yuniel Dorticos was a professional boxing match contested on 3 February 2018, for the WBA and IBF cruiserweight championship.

== Background ==
Immediately after Gassiev's win over Włodarczyk in the last of the WBSS quarter finals, WBA "Regular" champion Yuniel Dorticos, who had stopped Dmitry Kudryashov in September, entered the ring. Dorticos told Gassiev, "Take a good vacation. I wanna prepare the right dosage for you of ibuprofen and anesthesia for the next fight, so it’s less painful."

On 29 October, Gassiev's trainer Abel Sanchez stated the fight could take place on 20 January 2018. The fight was confirmed to take place at the Bolshoy Ice Dome in Sochi, Russia on 3 February 2018.

On 1 February, the WBA demoted their champion Denis Lebedev to 'champion in recess' and promoted Dorticos from 'regular' to 'full' champion in order for the fight with Gassiev to be a true unification. The WBA stated the winner of the tournament would be mandated to fight Lebedev.

== The fight ==
Dorticos was always coming forward, but looked fatigued in the second half of the fight. Gassiev would drop Dorticos three times in the final round to score a dramatic win and advance to the final of the tournament. The first knockdown came after a left hook to the jaw. Dorticos got back to his feet on unsteady legs. Gassiev knocked him down for a second time with a left hook to the head. The last knockdown drove Dorticos through the ropes, forcing referee Eddie Claudio to end the bout at 2 minutes and 52 seconds. At the time of stoppage Gassiev was ahead 105-104, 106-103, 106-103 on all three scorecards. CompuBox Stats showed that Gassiev landed 190 of 608 punches thrown (31%) and Dorticos landed 132 of his 602 thrown (22%).

== Aftermath ==
After Gassiev's victory, unified WBO and WBC cruiserweight champion Oleksandr Usyk (who had beaten Mairis Briedis the previous week) entered the ring and congratulated him, setting up the final of the tournament, set to take place in Jeddah, Saudi Arabia on 11 May.

Dorticos was upset after the fight and remained on his stool for an extended period of time. He cried at the post fight press conference. Gassiev walked over to him and consoled him.

== Undercard ==
Confirmed bouts:

== Broadcasting ==
Country	Broadcaster
Baltic & Nordic countries	Viasat
Belgium	VOO
Bulgaria	Nova
Canada	Super Channel
Germany	SAT.1
Russia	Match! Boets
Singapore	StarHub
Sub-Saharan Africa	TVMS
Turkey	Tivibu Sports
United Kingdom	ITV
United States	Audience
Ukraine	Inter

Preceded by vs. Krzysztof Włodarczyk	Murat Gassiev's bouts 3 February 2018	Succeeded by vs. Oleksandr Usyk
Preceded by vs. Dmitry Kudryashov	Yuniel Dorticos's bouts 3 February 2018	Succeeded by vs. Mateusz Masternak
