= Murat Gassiev =

Russian boxer (born 1993)

Murat Gassiev Мурат Гассиев Гасситы Мурат
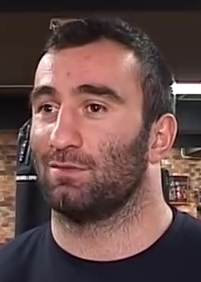
- Gassiev in 2017

Personal information
- Nickname: Iron
- Born: Murat Georgievich Gassiev; 12 October 1993 (age 33) Vladikavkaz, North Ossetia-Alania, Russia
- Height: 1.89 m (6 ft 2 1/2 in)
- Weight: Cruiserweight; Heavyweight

Boxing career
- Reach: 193 cm (76 in)
- Stance: Orthodox

Boxing record
- Total fights: 37
- Wins: 34
- Win by KO: 27
- Losses: 2
- No contests: 1

Murat Georgievich Gassiev (Russian: Мурат Георгиевич Гассиев; born 12 October 1993) is a Russian professional boxer. He has held world championships in two weight classes, having held World Boxing Association (WBA) heavyweight title since June 2026, and previously the unified International Boxing Federation (IBF) and WBA (Unified) cruiserweight titles.

Along with Evander Holyfield, David Haye and Oleksandr Usyk, Gassiev is one of only four boxers in history to have unified the cruiserweight world titles and become a world heavyweight champion.

== Early life ==
Gassiev is from Vladikavkaz, the capital of North Ossetia-Alania, and is of Ossetian Iron descent.

== Amateur career ==
Gassiev had a short amateur career, consisting of 25 fights.

== Professional career ==
=== Early career ===
Gassiev made his professional boxing debut at the age of 17 on 21 September 2011. He fought at the Manezh in Vladikavkaz, Russia, beating 22 year-old Ukrainian Roman Mirzoev—who was only 0–3 at the time—in a scheduled four-round fight that went the distance, earning a unanimous decision with scores of 40–37, 39–38, and 39–38 in his favour. Gassiev had his second fight in November at the Traktor Sport Palace in Chelyabinsk, Russia, defeating Vladimir Chuklin, knocking him out in round four. Over the next 18 months, Gassiev remained unbeaten with a record of 11 wins, including seven KOs, at the age of 19.

In June 2013, Gassiev defeated 24 year-old Levan Jomardashvili (31–10, 21 KOs) to claim the vacant WBC Youth world cruiserweight title at the Yunost Arena in Chelyabinsk. In round one, Jomardashvili was dropped twice; after dropping him a further two times in the second round, Gassiev won by stoppage. Gassiev defended the title in December against Ivica Bacurin, who has a record of 16–3–1 (7 KOs). The fight went the full ten rounds as Gassiev won via unanimous decision (98–89, 100–87, 96–91). Bacurin was knocked down once each in rounds two, eight, and ten. He also had a point deducted in round ten.

On 1 February 2014, Gassiev fought veteran 31 year-old Belgian boxer Ismail Abdoul (51–27–2, 19 KOs). This was the first 12-round fight Gassiev was involved in and it went the whole distance. The scorecards read 120–108, 117–111 and 115–113, all in favor of Gassiev. With the win, he also won the vacant IBF East/West Europe cruiserweight title. On 30 August 2014, Gassiev fought on the undercard of WBO cruiserweight title fight between Huck and Larghetti at the Gerry Weber Stadium in Halle, Nordrhein-Westfalen, Germany. He knocked out the undefeated Leon Harth (9–0, 6 KOs). Two months later, Gassiev won the vacant IBF Inter-Continental cruiserweight title after stopping Engin Karakaplan in round one. It was in this year that Gassiev began training with Abel Sanchez.

=== Rise up the ranks ===
Gassiev had a busy year in 2015, fighting four times. In January he made his debut in the United States, stopping Terrance Smith in round four before fighting his biggest challenge to date, former USBA and NABF cruiserweight champion Felix Cora Jr. (25–6–2, 14 KOs) at the Foxwoods Resort in Mashantucket, Connecticut. Gassiev successfully defended his IBF Inter-Continental title in round nine of the scheduled 12 round fight. Gassiev stalked Cora early with an assault to the body. In round nine, Cora could no longer defend himself, which forced referee Johnny Callas to finally stop the fight.

In June 2015, Gassiev knocked out Rodney Moore in two rounds and then fought the undefeated Isiah Thomas (15–0, 6 KOs) on 18 December 2015 at the Palms Casino Resort, in Las Vegas, Nevada in an IBF eliminator. The fight ended after round three in a no contest after Thomas was hit accidentally after the bell and could no longer continue following the ringside doctor's orders. Thomas controlled the majority of the three rounds before Gassiev landed hard shots up until the premature ending of the bout.

It was announced that Gassiev would get another opportunity in an eliminator against #10 IBF Jordan Shimmell (20–1, 16 KOs), whose only defeat came to Isiah Thomas. The fight took place at the Black Bear Casino in Carlton, Minnesota on 17 May 2016. Gassiev stayed unbeaten in defeating Shimmell in a first-round knockout. Gassiev knocked Shimmell down with a left hook to the head. The back of Shimmell's head bounced off the canvas when he was knocked down and was out cold. Shimmell was also knocked under the ropes when he fell. The fight was immediately stopped by referee Mark Nelson with just six seconds of round one remaining. With the win, Gassiev was now the IBF mandatory challenger to unified WBA and IBF cruiserweight champion Denis Lebedev, who defeated Victor Emilio Ramirez in a unification bout the following week.

=== IBF cruiserweight champion ===
==== Gassiev vs. Lebedev ====
It was announced in August 2016, that a fight between Gassiev and unified cruiserweight world champion Denis Lebedev (29–2, 22 KOs) was in the works and a date was set for 3 December 2016 at the Megasport Arena in Moscow. At the official weigh in on 2 December, Lebedev weighed in at 199.7 lbs as Gassiev weighed 198.3 lbs. Lebedev successfully applied for only the IBF title to be at stake, retaining his WBA (Super) title regardless of the result. Lebedev kept the attack up through the 12 rounds as he went on to lose a split decision, losing the IBF title in the process. Two judges scored it 116–112 and 116–111 for Gassiev as the third scored it 114–113 for Lebedev. Lebedev was knocked down in round 5, following a left shot to the body, but managed to beat the count and immediately changed style to avoid further punishment to the body. In the post fight interviews, Lebedev thought he had done enough to win the fight or at least earn a draw and wanted a rematch.

=== World Boxing Super Series ===
Gassiev entered the World Boxing Super Series tournament when it was announced. The 8-man knockout style tournament would determine the best in the division and include other top cruiserweight champions and contenders.

==== Gassiev vs. Włodarczyk ====
At the Draft Gala, which took place on 8 July 2017, although Gassiev was second-seeded, meaning he could pick whom he wanted to fight, his choice was pre-determined to be former IBF and WBC cruiserweight champion Krzysztof Włodarczyk (53–3–1, 37 KOs) by the IBF, in a mandatory fight. It was announced on 8 September by Ringstar Sports that the fight would take place in Newark, New Jersey, at the Prudential Center on 21 October 2017. One of the main factors for the fight taking place in New Jersey was the Polish population in that state. Gassiev delivered a dominant third-round KO, retaining his IBF title and securing his place in the semi-finals. Gassiev was in control the opening two rounds working away on Włodarczyk. Midway through round 3, having Włodarczyk against the ropes, Gassiev connected with a left uppercut to the head, which was immediately followed by a left to the body, dropping Włodarczyk on all fours, flat on the canvas. Włodarczyk, clearly in pain, failed to beat the 10 count. The official time of stoppage was 1:57 of the round. Gassiev, who was pleased with his performance, said, "I had a great opponent tonight. I prepared myself for a tough fight, but it is boxing, and anything can happen. We do a lot of work in the gym, and I just listened to my coach round after round, and he told me what I needed to do. That's all I needed." Włodarczyk accepted defeat admitting the better man won.

=== Unified cruiserweight champion ===
==== Gassiev vs. Dorticos ====
Immediately after Gassiev's win over Włodarczyk, WBA 'Regular' champion Yuniel Dorticos (22–0, 21 KOs), who defeated Dmitry Kudryashov in September to advance to the semi-finals, entered the ring. Gassiev and Dorticos posed in a face off to start the buildup to their fight. Dorticos told Gassiev, "Take a good vacation. I wanna prepare the right dosage for you of ibuprofen and anesthesia for the next fight, so it’s less painful." On 29 October 2017, Gassiev's trainer Abel Sanchez stated the fight could take place on 20 January 2018. The fight was confirmed to take place at the Bolshoy Ice Dome in Sochi, Russia on 3 February 2018. On 1 February 2018, the WBA demoted Lebedev to 'champion in recess' and promoted Dorticos from 'regular' to 'full' champion in order for the fight with Gassiev to be a true unification. The WBA stated the winner of the tournament would be mandated to fight Lebedev.

Gassiev dropped Dorticos three times in round 12 to score a dramatic win and advance to the final of the tournament. The last knockdown drove Dorticos through the ropes, forcing referee Eddie Claudio to end the bout at 2 minutes and 52 seconds. At the time of stoppage Gassiev was ahead 105–104, 106–103, 106–103 on all three scorecards. The first knockdown came after a left hook to the jaw. Dorticos got back to his feet on unsteady legs. Gassiev knocked him down for a second time with a left hook to the head. Dorticos was always coming forward, but looked fatigued in the second half of the fight. CompuBox Stats showed that Gassiev landed 190 of 608 punches thrown (31%), this included 139 of 278 power punches and Dorticos landed 132 of his 602 thrown (22%). Dorticos was upset after the fight and remained on his stool for an extended period of time. He cried at the post fight press conference. Gassiev walked over to him and consoled him.

==== Gassiev vs. Usyk ====
After Gassiev defeated Dorticos, unified WBO and WBC cruiserweight champion Oleksandr Usyk (14–0, 11 KOs) entered the ring and congratulated him, setting up the final of the tournament, to take place in Jeddah, Saudi Arabia on 11 May 2018. A day after Gassiev's win, the Russian Boxing Federation's Secretary General, Umar Kremlev stated that he would push forward in order to outbid Saudi Arabia and have the final of the tournament take place in Russia on the Day of Russian Boxing on 22 July. In a statement, he said, "We will put maximum pressure on the organizers of the WBSS to make the final of the tournament in Russia. We have already started to act and have indicated our intention to break the price being paid for the show by Saudi Arabia." On 5 February, The Ring Magazine announced the winner would receive their vacant cruiserweight title as Usyk and Gassiev are ranked #1 and #2 respectively in their weight. After returning to North Ossetia, where he was met with 3,000 people, Gassiev stated he would be moving up to heavyweight after fighting Usyk. On 16 April, it was reported that Usyk had suffered an elbow injury during training, pushing the final to possibly June or July 2018. With the Russian Boxing Federation still pushing to host the final on 22 July in Moscow, Usyk replied that he would not be fighting Gassiev in Russia. He went on to say the fight could still place in Moscow, but he would not be involved. Kremlev replied that it was not up to himself or Usyk as to where the final would be held. On 18 June, at a press conference, Kremlev announced the final would take place on 21 July at the Olympic Stadium in Moscow, Russia. On 29 June, the final was officially confirmed. On the release date, 7,000 tickets were sold. Both boxers came in at 198.45 pounds at the weigh-in.

Usyk quickly took control of the fight, moving rapidly and using his "beautiful, commandeering jab". Despite facing a hostile hometown crowd, Usyk controlled the fight, not allowing Gassiev to use his power. Gassiev did not land a solid punch until the end of round 2. According to many reports, Usyk outclassed, outboxed, and dominated Gassiev. The result was never in question as Usyk was declared winner by unanimous decision with the scores of 120–108, 119–109, 119–109. Muhammad Ali's widow, Lonnie Ali presented the trophy to Usyk. After the fight, both combatants were exemplars of good sportsmanship, embracing, with Gassiev saying "I had the best opponent of my professional career ... today is Oleksandr's day". Usyk humbly adding "My team made me look like I looked in the ring. This is our victory". The win made Usyk the first ever four-belt undisputed cruiserweight champion. Usyk dominated throughout, landing 252 of 939 thrown punches (27%), compared to Gassiev's 91 landed of 313 thrown (29%). Usyk used his superior conditioning to finish the fight, also increasing his output by landing 47 of 117 punches thrown in round 12. Usyk managed to withstand the 32 power body shots he received and continued to move around the ring.

On 17 August 2018, it was reported that Gassiev would take time out to deal with an ongoing shoulder injury, potentially leading to surgery. His co-promoter, Leon Margules stated, "Gassiev may need surgery, he has a left shoulder injury. We have not talked about his future. As soon as Murat recovers from injuries, we will discuss the situation." At this point, there was no indication on whether Gassiev would remain at cruiserweight or move up to heavyweight.

=== Heavyweight ===
Gassiev underwent surgery and remained on the sidelines. In March 2019, Gassiev stated he would make a decision on what weight he would compete at. He advised he had already began training and would join Abel Sanchez in the coming weeks. When asked which platform he would fight on, Gassiev only mentioned he would start negotiations with DAZN streaming service. On 8 April, it was reported that Gassiev would make his heavyweight debut in June 2019. On 18 April, Matchroom Boxing USA announced they had agreed a deal with Ural Boxing Promotion and Warriors Boxing to co-promote Gassiev, which would see him fight on DAZN. On the new deal, Gassiev said, "I am confident that this cooperation will bring great results. I want to make all my fans around the world happy and realize my full potential in the exciting Heavyweight division." Matchroom Boxing USA's Eddie Hearn also welcomed Gassiev stating there was a lot of options for Gassiev in regards to opponents.

On 31 October 2020, Gassiev had his debut at heavyweight against Nuri Seferi for the vacant Ren TV heavyweight title. Gassiev hit Seferi with a massive right hand in the first round, which sent Seferi to the canvas. Seferi, only being stopped once before in his professional career, managed to get up, but was noticeably wobbly and the referee waved the fight off.

Gassiev faced the former WBO European heavyweight champion Michael Wallisch for the vacant WBA Asia heavyweight title on 22 July 2021, at the Dynamo Volleyball Arena in Moscow, Russia. Gassiev dropped Wallisch with a combination of a body shot and an overhand right near the end of the fourth round. Although Wallisch was able to beat the ten count, he was stopped quickly after with a flurry of punches from Gassiev.

Gassiev was expected to face Andriy Rudenko on 25 December 2021. He withdrew from the fight on 8 December, after breaking his right arm while sparring. Gassiev was next booked to face Carlouse Welch for the vacant EBP heavyweight title on 26 August 2022, at the Belgrade Waterfront Plato Arena in Belgrade, Serbia. He won the fight by a first-round knockout, needing just 87 seconds to stop his opponent.

Gassiev faced Mike Balogun on 3 March 2023 for the vacant WBA Inter-Continental Heavyweight title. He won via KO in round 2, knocking Balogun down with a right cross. Balogun failed to make the count, and was subsequently counted out.

==== Gassiev vs. Wallin ====
Gassiev faced Otto Wallin on 30 September 2023, defending his WBA Inter-Continental title. He lost via split decision, in a very close fight where, despite spending the majority of the fight on the offensive, he landed very little in the way of effective punches, and even spent long periods of time not throwing any punches at all.

Gassiev faced undefeated boxer Kem Ljungquist on 26 October 2024. He won via TKO in the fifth round, dropping Ljungquist with a left hook to the liver. Ljungquist failed to make the count, and was subsequently counted out.

Gassiev faced Jeremiah Milton on 23 August 2025. He won via technical knockout due to a doctor stoppage in the seventh round.

=== WBA (Regular) heavyweight champion ===
==== Gassiev vs. Pulev ====
Gassiev won the WBA (Regular) heavyweight title by knocking out defending champion Kubrat Pulev in the sixth round at Duty Free Tennis Stadium in Dubai on 12 December 2025.

=== WBA heavyweight champion ===
==== Gassiev vs. Kadiru ====
Following undisputed champion Oleksandr Usyk's decision to vacate his world titles, the WBA officially elevated Gassiev to full champion status in June 2026, establishing him as Russia's first world heavyweight titleholder in over a decade. Gassiev was originally scheduled to make his first title defense against 2016 Olympic gold medalist Tony Yoka on 11 July 2026 at the VTB Arena in Moscow, Russia. However, in early July, Yoka was forced to withdraw due to a back injury sustained in training camp. On 6 July 2026, it was officially announced that German contender Peter Kadiru would step in on less than a week's notice as the replacement challenger for the championship bout. Gassiev won by TKO in the sixth round.

== Professional boxing record ==
37 fights	34 wins	2 losses
By knockout	27	0
By decision	7	2
No contests	1	

No.	Result	Record	Opponent	Type	Round, time	Date	Location	Notes
37	Win	34–2 (1)	Peter Kadiru	TKO	6 (12), 1:00	11 Jul 2026	VTB Arena, Moscow, Russia	Retained WBA heavyweight title
36	Win	33–2 (1)	Kubrat Pulev	KO	6 (12), 0:50	12 Dec 2025	Duty Free Tennis Stadium, Dubai, UAE	Won WBA (Regular) heavyweight title
35	Win	32–2 (1)	Jeremiah Milton	TKO	7 (10), 0:15	23 Aug 2025	Miccosukee Indian Gaming Resort, Miami, Florida, US	
34	Win	31–2 (1)	Kem Ljungquist	KO	5 (10), 2:29	26 Oct 2024	Karen Demirchyan Complex, Yerevan, Armenia	
33	Loss	30–2 (1)	Otto Wallin	SD	12	30 Sep 2023	Regnum Carya Hotel, Antalya, Turkey	Lost WBA Inter-Continental heavyweight title
32	Win	30–1 (1)	Mike Balogun	KO	2 (10), 1:40	3 Mar 2023	Karen Demirchyan Complex, Yerevan, Armenia	Won vacant WBA Inter-Continental heavyweight title
31	Win	29–1 (1)	Carlouse Welch	TKO	1 (10), 1:27	26 Aug 2022	Belgrade Waterfront Plato Arena, Belgrade, Serbia	Won vacant EBP heavyweight title
30	Win	28–1 (1)	Michael Wallisch	TKO	4 (10), 3:00	22 Jul 2021	Dynamo Volleyball Arena, Moscow, Russia	Won vacant WBA Asia heavyweight title
29	Win	27–1 (1)	Nuri Seferi	TKO	1 (10), 1:33	31 Oct 2020	WoW Arena, Krasnaya Polyana, Russia	Won vacant Ren TV heavyweight title
28	Loss	26–1 (1)	Oleksandr Usyk	UD	12	21 Jul 2018	Olympic Stadium, Moscow, Russia	Lost WBA (Unified) and IBF cruiserweight titles; For WBC, WBO, and vacant The Ring cruiserweight titles; World Boxing Super Series: cruiserweight final
27	Win	26–0 (1)	Yuniel Dorticos	TKO	12 (12), 2:52	3 Feb 2018	Bolshoy Ice Dome, Sochi, Russia	Retained IBF cruiserweight title; Won WBA (Unified) cruiserweight title; World Boxing Super Series: cruiserweight semi-final
26	Win	25–0 (1)	Krzysztof Włodarczyk	KO	3 (12), 1:57	21 Oct 2017	Prudential Center, Newark, New Jersey, US	Retained IBF cruiserweight title; World Boxing Super Series: cruiserweight quarter-final
25	Win	24–0 (1)	Denis Lebedev	SD	12	3 Dec 2016	Megasport Arena, Moscow, Russia	Won IBF cruiserweight title
24	Win	23–0 (1)	Jordan Shimmell	KO	1 (12), 2:54	17 May 2016	Black Bear Casino, Carlton, Minnesota, US	
23	NC	22–0 (1)	Isiah Thomas	NC	3 (12), 3:00	18 Dec 2015	Pearl Concert Theater, Paradise, Nevada, US	NC after Thomas was unable to continue from an accidental punch following the bell
22	Win	22–0	Rodney Moore	KO	2 (6), 1:55	13 Jun 2015	Florentine Gardens, Los Angeles, California, US	
21	Win	21–0	Felix Cora Jr.	TKO	9 (12), 1:10	17 Apr 2015	Foxwoods Resort Casino, Ledyard, Connecticut, US	Retained IBF Inter-Continental cruiserweight title
20	Win	20–0	Terrance Smith	TKO	4 (6), 2:29	23 Jan 2015	Quiet Cannon, Montebello, California, US	
19	Win	19–0	Engin Karakaplan	TKO	1 (12), 1:39	31 Oct 2014	Manezh, Vladikavkaz, Russia	Won vacant IBF Inter-Continental cruiserweight title
18	Win	18–0	Leon Harth	TKO	4 (10), 2:46	30 Aug 2014	Gerry Weber Stadion, Halle, Germany	
17	Win	17–0	Daniil Peretyatko	RTD	1 (8), 3:00	25 Jun 2014	Sport Hall, Tskhinvali, Georgia	
16	Win	16–0	Giorgi Tevdorashvili	TKO	2 (8), 2:00	14 May 2014	Restaurant "Zolotaya Korona", Vladikavkaz, Russia	
15	Win	15–0	Ismail Abdoul	UD	12	1 Feb 2014	Traktor Sport Palace, Chelyabinsk, Russia	Won vacant IBF East/West Europe cruiserweight title
14	Win	14–0	Ivica Bacurin	UD	10	13 Dec 2013	Traktor Sport Palace, Chelyabinsk, Russia	Retained WBC Youth cruiserweight title
13	Win	13–0	Roman Mirzoev	RTD	3 (6), 3:00	13 Sep 2013	Restaurant "Zolotaya Korona", Vladikavkaz, Russia	
12	Win	12–0	Levan Jomardashvili	TKO	2 (10), 1:10	26 Jun 2013	Yunost Sport Palace, Chelyabinsk, Russia	Won vacant WBC Youth cruiserweight title
11	Win	11–0	Igor Pylypenko	TKO	4 (6), 1:21	26 May 2013	Sports Complex Mordovia, Saransk, Russia	
10	Win	10–0	Farruh Madaminov	KO	2 (8), 2:43	11 May 2013	Tennis Centre, Khanty-Mansiysk, Russia	
9	Win	9–0	Denis Solomko	TKO	3 (8), 2:50	16 Mar 2013	Sports Palace "Znamya", Noginsk, Russia	
8	Win	8–0	Ivan Serbin	UD	6	24 Nov 2012	Yunost Sport Palace, Chelyabinsk, Russia	
7	Win	7–0	Ruslan Semenov	TKO	3 (6), 1:38	13 Oct 2012	Sport Hall, Tskhinvali, Georgia	
6	Win	6–0	Peter Hegyes	TKO	2 (6)	24 Jul 2012	Budva, Montenegro	
5	Win	5–0	Teymuraz Kekelidze	TKO	1 (6), 2:36	31 May 2012	Ufa Arena, Ufa, Russia	
4	Win	4–0	Igor Pylypenko	UD	6	8 Apr 2012	Sports Palace "Znamya", Noginsk, Russia	
3	Win	3–0	Daniil Zakharenko	UD	4	16 Mar 2012	Circus, Krasnodar, Russia	
2	Win	2–0	Vladimir Chuklin	TKO	4 (4), 1:27	26 Nov 2011	Traktor Ice Arena, Chelyabinsk, Russia	
1	Win	1–0	Roman Mirzoev	UD	4	21 Sep 2011	Manezh, Vladikavkaz, Russia	

== Titles in boxing ==
=== Major world titles ===
- WBA cruiserweight champion (200 lbs)
- IBF cruiserweight champion (200 lbs)
- WBA heavyweight champion (200+ lbs)

=== Secondary major world titles ===
- WBA (Regular) heavyweight champion (200+ lbs)

=== Regional/International titles ===
- WBC Youth cruiserweight champion (200 lbs)
- IBF East/West Europe cruiserweight champion (200 lbs)
- IBF Intercontinental cruiserweight champion (200 lbs)
- Ren TV heavyweight champion (200+ lbs)
- WBA Asia heavyweight champion (200+ lbs)
- EBP heavyweight champion (200+ lbs)
- WBA Intercontinental heavyweight champion (200+ lbs)

== See also ==
- List of cruiserweight boxing champions
- List of world Heavyweight boxing champions

Sporting positions
Regional boxing titles
Vacant Title last held by Agron Dzila	WBC Youth cruiserweight champion 26 June 2013 – February 2014; Vacated	Vacant Title next held by Micki Nielsen
Vacant Title last held by Goran Delic	IBF East/West Europe cruiserweight champion 1 February 2014 – 31 October 2014; Won Inter-Continental title	Vacant Title next held by René Hübner
Vacant Title last held by Paweł Kołodziej	IBF Inter-Continental cruiserweight champion 31 October 2014 – February 2016; Vacated	Vacant Title next held by Mairis Briedis
New title	Ren TV heavyweight champion 31 October 2020 – ? Vacated	Vacant
World boxing titles
Preceded by Denis Lebedev	IBF cruiserweight champion 3 December 2016 – 21 July 2018	Succeeded by Oleksandr Usyk
Preceded by Yuniel Dorticos as champion	WBA cruiserweight champion Unified title 3 February 2018 – 21 July 2018	Succeeded by Oleksandr Usyk as Super champion
Preceded by Kubrat Pulev	WBA heavyweight champion 12 Dec 2025 – present Regular title until June 26, 2026	Incumbent
