= Oleksandr Usyk vs. Murat Gassiev =

Boxing match

- Date: 21 July 2018
- Venue: Olympic Stadium, Moscow, Russia
- Title(s) on the line: WBC, WBA, IBF WBO, The Ring and TBRB undisputed cruiserweight titles

Tale of the tape
Boxer	(Ukraine) Oleksandr Usyk	(Russia) Murat Gassiev
Nickname	"The Cat"	"Iron"
Hometown	Simferopol, Ukraine	Vladikavkaz, Russia
Pre-fight record	14–0 (11 KO)	26–0 (1) (20 KO)
Age	31 years, 6 months	24 years, 9 months
Height	6 ft 3 in (191 cm)	6 ft 3 in (191 cm)
Weight	198 1/4 lb (90 kg)	198 1/4 lb (90 kg)
Style	Southpaw	Orthodox
Recognition	WBC and WBO; Cruiserweight Champion; The Ring/TBRB; No. 1 Ranked Cruiserweight; The Ring No. 10 ranked pound-for-pound fighter	WBA and IBF; Cruiserweight Champion; The Ring/TBRB; No. 2 Ranked Cruiserweight

Result
- Usyk defeats Gassiev via UD (120–108, 119–109, 119–109)

Oleksandr Usyk vs. Murat Gassiev was a professional boxing match contested on 21 July 2018, for the undisputed cruiserweight championship.

== Background ==
Initially, the WBSS final was scheduled for 11 May 2018 in Jeddah, Saudi Arabia, however the secretary general of the Russian Boxing Federation, Umar Kremlev, stated that he would push forward in order to outbid Saudi Arabia and have the final of the tournament take place in Russia.

On 16 April, it was reported that Usyk had suffered an elbow injury during training, pushing the final to possibly June or July. On 18 June, at a press conference, Kremlev announced the final would take place on 21 July at the Olympic Stadium, Moscow, Russia. On 29 June, the final was officially confirmed. On the release date, 7,000 tickets were sold.

== The fight ==
Usyk quickly took control of the fight, moving rapidly and using his jab, while not allowing Gassiev to use his power. Gassiev did not land a solid punch until the end of round 2. Usyk outclassed, outboxed, and dominated Gassiev.

The result was never in question as after 12 rounds Usyk was declared the winner by unanimous decision, with the judges’ scorecards reading 120–108, 119–109, and 119–109. Usyk's dominance was reflected in the punch stats, as CompuBox recorded him landing 252 of 939 thrown punches (27%), compared to Gassiev's 91 landed of 313 thrown (29%). Usyk used his superior conditioning to finish the fight, increasing his output by landing 47 of 117 punches thrown in round 12. Usyk managed to withstand the 32 power body shots he received and continued to move around the ring.

== Aftermath ==
Muhammad Ali's widow, Lonnie Ali, presented the trophy to Usyk. After the fight both combatants embraced, with Gassiev saying "I had the best opponent of my professional career ... today is Oleksandr's day". Usyk added "My team made me look like I looked in the ring. This is our victory". The win made Usyk the first ever four-belt undisputed cruiserweight champion.

When asked whom he would like to fight next, Usyk said, "At this time I have heard that Tony Bellew wants to fight the winner of the Muhammad Ali Trophy. I hope he will see me talking.... 'hey Tony Bellew, are you ready?' If he doesn't want to go down [in weight], I will go up [in weight] for him. I will eat more spaghetti for my dinner!" Also after the fight Usyk said: "Olympic [stadium], thanks. People, countrymen and those who supported. Moscow 2018. Bang! Daddy's in the building!".

== Undercard ==
Confirmed bouts:

== Broadcasting ==
In Ukraine, the fight ended up being the 14th-highest rated television program of 2018 in the commercial (Note: Viewers aged 18–54 from cities with population 50,000+) demographic with a 6.7 rating (30.1 share).

Country	Broadcaster
Baltic & Nordic countries	Viasat
Belgium	VOO
Bulgaria	Nova
Canada	Super Channel
Germany	SAT.1
Russia	Match! Boets
Singapore	StarHub
Sub-Saharan Africa	TVMS
Turkey	Tivibu Sports
United Kingdom	ITV
United States	Audience
Ukraine	Inter

== See also ==
- Evander Holyfield vs. Carlos De León
- Jean-Marc Mormeck vs. O'Neil Bell

Preceded by vs. Mairis Briedis	Oleksandr Usyk's bouts 21 July 2018	Succeeded by vs. Tony Bellew
Preceded by vs. Yuniel Dorticos	Murat Gassiev's bouts 21 July 2018	Succeeded by vs. Nuri Seferi
