= Jordan Shimmell =

American boxer

Jordan Shimmell (born 10 October 1988) is an American former professional boxer. He competed in the cruiserweight division and his professional record is 20–2 (16 KOs). He last fought in May 2016. He is best known for winning the National Golden Gloves and the US Champion title at 201 lbs in 2009.

== Early life ==
Shimmell was born in Sheboygan, Wisconsin, United States.

== Amateur career ==
Shimmell started boxing at age eight and won the Michigan Silver Gloves State Championship in 1998, 2000 and 2003. He also won the Michigan Junior Olympics State Championship in 1999, 2000, 2001, 2003, 2004 and 2005. Shimmell won the Great Lakes (Region 5) Junior Olympic Championship in 2003, 2004 and 2005. He advanced to the National Junior Olympics Championships both years he was eligible. He won the bronze medal in the 189 pound division at the 2004 National Junior Olympics Championships. In the 2005 National Junior Olympics Championships, Shimmell won the gold medal in the heavyweight (201 pound) division He defeated the defending National Junior Olympic champion Bear Richardson, the brother of Olympian Rock Allen, by a score of 6–1. Also as a Junior Olympic division boxer (ages 8–16), He won the National Junior Golden Gloves Championship in 2001, 2003 and 2004.

=== Seniors ===
On turning 17, Shimmell began competing in the open-class of USA Boxing (the experienced boxers ages 17–34). In his first open-class tournament, he won the 2006 Michigan State Tournament. A few months later in 2006, he competed in his first Golden Gloves tournament and won the Western Michigan Golden Gloves, the Michigan Golden Gloves.

He was the runner-up in the 2006 National Golden Gloves in the heavyweight (201 pound) division. He lost a 3–2 split decision to the defending champion Eric Fields who was the Golden Boy award winner for the most outstanding boxer of the tournament in both the 2005 and 2006 National Golden Gloves Tournament of Champions.

In the first Midwestern Trials held in Cincinnati, Ohio, in April 2007, Shimmell won the heavyweight (201 pound) championship. He again won the Michigan Golden Gloves tournament in 2007, but an injury hindered him in the 2007 National Golden Gloves Tournament of Champions. In June 2007, at the U.S. Championships, Shimmell lost a 12–11 decision to Quantis Graves, missing the chance to compete in the United States Olympic Trials for the 2008 Olympics. Graves went on to become the runner-up at the United States Olympic Trials.

Shimmell won the 1st World Golden Gloves Tournament of Champions in November 2007. He defeated Jamie Power of Ireland in the semi-finals on a 5–0 unanimous decision and went on to knock out Mike McDonagh of Great Britain in the second round. He won by RSCH-2 and received the Championship belt for the 201-pound division. The World Golden Gloves tournament was held at the Grand Casino in Hinckley, Minnesota.

In 2009, he won both the Golden Gloves and the US championships at the age of 20. In 2010, Shimmell was the National Golden Gloves runner-up losing a very close split decision in the finals. In June 2011, Shimmell returned to the top, winning his 2nd USA Boxing National Championships gold medal in three years (2009 & 2011).

Shimmell won each bout along the way and once again become the #1 amateur heavyweight in the United States by scores of 14–8 (finals), 19–7 (semi-finals), 18–12 (quarter-finals) and 12–5 (preliminaries).

== Personal life ==
Shimmell lives in Hudsonville, Michigan, United States.

== Professional boxing record ==
20 Wins (16 knockouts, 4 decision), 2 Losses (1 decisions, 1 knockout)
Result	Record	Opponent	Opponent's record	Type	Round	Date	Location	Notes
Win	1-0	(United States) Kolmarge Harris	2-15	TKO	2	30/06/2012	(United States) Holland Civic Center, Holland, Michigan	Referee stopped the bout at 2:58 of the second round
Win	2-0	(United States) Mario Huffman	0-1	TKO	2	21/07/2012	(United States) Lifestyle Pavilion, Columbus, Ohio	Referee stopped the bout at 2:35 of the second round.
Win	3-0	(United States) Robert Feirick	--	TKO	1	17/08/2012	(United States) Fifth Third Ballpark, Comstock Park, Michigan	Referee stopped the bout at 0:51 of the first round.
Win	4-0	(United States) Joe Stofle	12-19-2	TKO	2	27/09/2012	(United States) Motor City Casino, Detroit, Michigan	Referee stopped the bout at 0:48 of the second round.
Win	5-0	(United States) Travis Fulton	18-30	TKO	2	27/10/2012	(United States) Black Bear Casino, Carlton, Minnesota	Referee stopped the bout at 2:47 of the second round.
Win	6-0	(United States) Clinton Boldridge	10-18-1	KO	2	10/11/2012	(United States) Dance Land Ballroom, Davenport, Iowa	
Win	7-0	(United States) Lance Gauch	3-5-1	UD	6	21/12/2012	(United States) Grand Plaza Hotel, Toledo, Ohio	
Loss	19-1	(United States) Isiah Thomas	14-0	UD	12	25/07/2015	(United States) Palms Casino and Resort, Las Vegas, Nevada	Vacant USBA cruiserweight title.
Win	20-1	(United States) Willis Lockett	14-15-5	DQ		27/02/2016	(United States) Walter E. Washington Convention Center, Washington, D.C.	
Loss	20-2	(Russia) Murat Gassiev	22-0	KO	1	17/05/2016	(United States) Black Bear Casino, Carlton, Minnesota	
