= Olanrewaju Durodola =

Nigerian boxer

Personal information
- Nickname: God's Power
- Nationality: Nigerian
- Born: 16 October 1980 (age 45) Abuja, Nigeria
- Height: 6 ft 2 1/2 in (1.89 m)
- Weight: Cruiserweight

Boxing career
- Reach: 77 in (196 cm)
- Stance: Orthodox

Boxing record
- Total fights: 60
- Wins: 50
- Win by KO: 44
- Losses: 10

Olanrewaju Durodola (born 16 October 1980) is a Nigerian professional boxer who has held the African cruiserweight title since February 2020, and previously the WBC Silver cruiserweight title from 2015 to 2016. As an amateur he competed at the 2008 Summer Olympics and 2009 World Championships, both at heavyweight.

== Career ==
In his only previous major event he suffered a 29:29 countback loss to Camille Michel of Seychelles at the 2006 Commonwealth Games.

The 1.92/6'3' Durodola did not compete at the 2007 All-Africa Games but qualified at the 2nd AIBA African 2008 Olympic Qualifying Tournament by beating among others Awusone Yekeni.

He lost his only Olympic match to Cuban Osmay Acosta, Acosta went on further to win a bronze medal.

He is noted for his knockout power, even in the amateurs, having stopped the vast majority of his opponents.

In 2011, Durodola has turned professional. His first professional bout was scheduled for 19 February at Memorial Hall in Kansas City, Kansas, but that fight was canceled when his opponent withdrew from the fight at the last minute. As of 2013, Durodola won the WBC Continental Americas Cruiserweight Championship title and WBC Silver Cruiserweight champion.

== Professional boxing record ==
58 fights, 48 wins (42 knockouts), 10 losses
Number	Result	Record	Opponent	Type	Rd., Time	Date	Location	Notes
42	Loss	34–8	(United Kingdom) Richard Riakporhe	TKO	5 (10), 0:36	2021-11-21	The SSE Arena Wembley, London, United Kingdom	For vacant WBC Silver cruiserweight title
41	Win	34–7	(Nigeria) Olarewaju Segun	TKO	4 (10), 3:00	2020-10-19	National Stadium, Lagos, Nigeria	Retained African cruiserweight title
40	Win	33–7	(Ghana) Abraham Tabul	TKO	3 (12)	2020-02-01	Old Kingsway Building, Accra, Ghana	Won vacant African cruiserweight title
39	Win	32–7	(Namibia) Vikapita Meroro	TKO	3 (10), 3:00	2019-11-30	Old Kingsway Building, Accra, Ghana	
38	Win	31–7	(Nigeria) Kabiru Towolawi	UD	10	2019-09-20	Jalisco boxing gym, Lagos, Nigeria	
37	Win	30–7	(Nigeria) Michael Godwin	TKO	2 (10), 0:39	2019-07-30	Police College (Squash Hall), Ikeja, Nigeria	
36	Loss	29–7	(Poland) Michał Cieślak	TKO	2 (10), 1:56	2019-05-31	MZOS Pruszków, Pruszków, Poland	For vacant Republic of Poland International cruiserweight title
35	Win	29–6	(Democratic Republic of the Congo) Maroy Sadiki	TKO	3 (12)	2018-10-26	Federal Palace Hotel, Lagos, Nigeria	Won vacant WBF cruiserweight title
34	Win	28–6	(Brazil) Jackson Dos Santos	KO	2 (10)	2018-08-25	Salón del Sindicato de Químicos y Petroquímicos, Bahía Blanca, Argentina	
33	Loss	27–6	(Poland) Krzysztof Włodarczyk	UD	12	2018-06-02	G2A Arena, Jasionka 953, Rzeszów, Poland	
32	Loss	27–5	(Russia) Maxim Vlasov	RTD	10 (12)	2018-02-03	Bolshoy Ice Dome, Adler, Russia	For vacant WBC Silver cruiserweight title
31	Win	27–4	(Democratic Republic of the Congo) Maroy Sadiki	TKO	5 (10)	2017-09-02	Seconds Out Boxing Gymnasium, Accra, Ghana	
30	Win	26–4	(Tanzania) Karama Nyilawila	TKO	2 (10)	2017-07-22	Bukom Boxing Arena, Accra, Ghana	
29	Loss	25–4	(Russia) Dmitry Kudryashov	TKO	5 (10), 2:17	2017-06-03	Sports Palace, Rostov-on-Don, Russia	For WBC Silver cruiserweight title
28	Win	25–3	(Malawi) Mussa Ajibu	TKO	5 (12), 2:56	2017-03-17	Bukom Boxing Arena, Accra, Ghana	Won vacant WBO Africa cruiserweight title
27	Win	24–3	(Tanzania) Pascal Ndomba	TKO	2 (12), 2:51	2016-12-02	Bukom Boxing Arena, Accra, Ghana	
26	Win	23–3	(Uruguay) Yuberti Suarez Diaz	KO	1 (12)	2016-08-12	The Melbourne Pavilion, Flemington, Victoria, Australia	
25	Loss	22–3	(Latvia) Mairis Briedis	TKO	9 (12)	2016-05-14	Arēna Rīga, Riga, Latvia	Lost WBC Silver cruiserweight title
24	Win	22–2	(Russia) Dmitry Kudryashov	TKO	2 (12), 2:29	2015-11-04	Basket-Hall Arena, Kazan, Russia	Won WBC Silver cruiserweight title
23	Win	21–2	(Ghana) Paakwesi Ankrah	KO	1 (10), 0:48	2015-08-23	The Elysium, Piccadilly Suites, Lagos, Nigeria	
22	Win	20–2	(Argentina) Walter David Cabral	KO	1 (10), 2:48	2015-07-11	Combat Club, São Paulo, Brazil	Retained WBC Continental Americas cruiserweight title
21	Win	19–2	(United States) Joell Godfrey	DQ	7 (10), 2:31	2014-12-10	(United States) Carriage Club, Kansas City, Missouri, U.S.	Retained WBC Continental Americas cruiserweight title
20	Win	18–2	(United States) Max Heyman	TKO	2 (10), 0:27	2014-06-13	(United States) Phil Welch Stadium, St. Joseph, Missouri, U.S.	Retained WBC Continental Americas cruiserweight title
19	Loss	17–2	(South Africa) Thabiso Mchunu	UD	10	2014-01-24	(United States) Resorts International, Atlantic City, New Jersey, U.S.	For vacant WBC-NABF cruiserweight title
18	Win	17–1	(United States) Mitch Williams	TKO	6 (10), 1:28	2013-10-26	(United States) CenterStage@NoDa, Charlotte, North Carolina, U.S.	Retained WBC Continental Americas cruiserweight title
17	Win	16–1	(United States) Harvey Jolly	TKO	3 (10), 2:12	2013-08-10	(United States) Beech Activity Center, Wichita, Kansas, U.S.	Retained WBC Continental Americas cruiserweight title
16	Win	15–1	(United States) Victor Barragan	TKO	4 (12), 3:00	2013-04-20	(United States) Fireman's Local 77, St. Joseph, Missouri	Won WBC Continental Americas cruiserweight title
15	Win	14–1	(United States) Shannon Miller	KO	2 (6), 1:56	2013-03-15	(United States) Omni New Daisy Theater, Memphis, Tennessee, U.S.	
14	Win	13–1	(United States) Billy Cunningham	TKO	1 (6), 2:15	2013-02-15	(United States) Omni New Daisy Theater, Memphis, Tennessee, U.S.	
13	Win	12–1	(Kenya) Aduku Nsor	KO	2 (8), 1:39	2012-12-08	Will Power Boxing Complex, Accra, Ghana	
12	Win	11–1	(Ghana) Ibrahim Marshall	TKO	1 (12), 2:47	2012-11-16	Will Power Boxing Complex, Accra, Ghana	Won vacant WABU cruiserweight title
11	Win	10–1	(United States) Sam Hill	TKO	1 (6), 2:17	2012-10-27	(United States) Canterbury Park, Shakopee, Minnesota, U.S.	
10	Loss	9–1	(Uzbekistan) Akhror Muralimov	TKO	5 (8), 1:21	2012-06-23	(United States) American Legion Hall, St. Joseph, Missouri, U.S.	
9	Win	9–0	(United States) Calvin Rooks	KO	1 (8), 1:37	2012-04-21	(United States) Rising Star Casino, Rising Sun, Indiana, U.S.	
8	Win	8–0	(United States) Maron Jackson	TKO	1 (6), 1:21	2012-04-05	(United States) Capitol Plaza Hotel, Jefferson City, Missouri, U.S.	
7	Win	7–0	(United States) Joseph Rabotte	KO	1 (4), 0:49	2012-03-17	(United States) Grand Ballroom, Atlanta, Georgia, U.S.	
6	Win	6–0	(United States) Lance Gauch	UD	4	2012-03-10	(United States) Admiral Coontz Armor, Hannibal, Missouri, U.S.	
5	Win	5–0	(United States) Dione Craig	KO	1 (4), 2:59	2012-02-11	(United States) Derby Park Expo, Louisville, Kentucky, U.S.	
4	Win	4–0	(United States) Jason Massie	TKO	1 (6), 2:30	2011-11-26	(United States) Union Plaza, Jefferson City, Missouri, U.S.	
3	Win	3–0	(United States) Benjamin Cantwell	TKO	1 (4), 1:33	2011-10-22	(United States) Independence Memorial Hall, Independence, Missouri, U.S.	
2	Win	2–0	(United States) Jamal Woods	TKO	3 (4), 2:42	17 September 2011	(United States) Bartle Hall, Kansas City, Missouri, U.S.	
1	Win	1–0	(United States) John Blanchard	TKO	1 (4)	11 June 2011	(United States) Memorial Hall, Kansas City, Kansas, U.S.	
