= Łukasz Janik =

Polish boxer (born 1985)

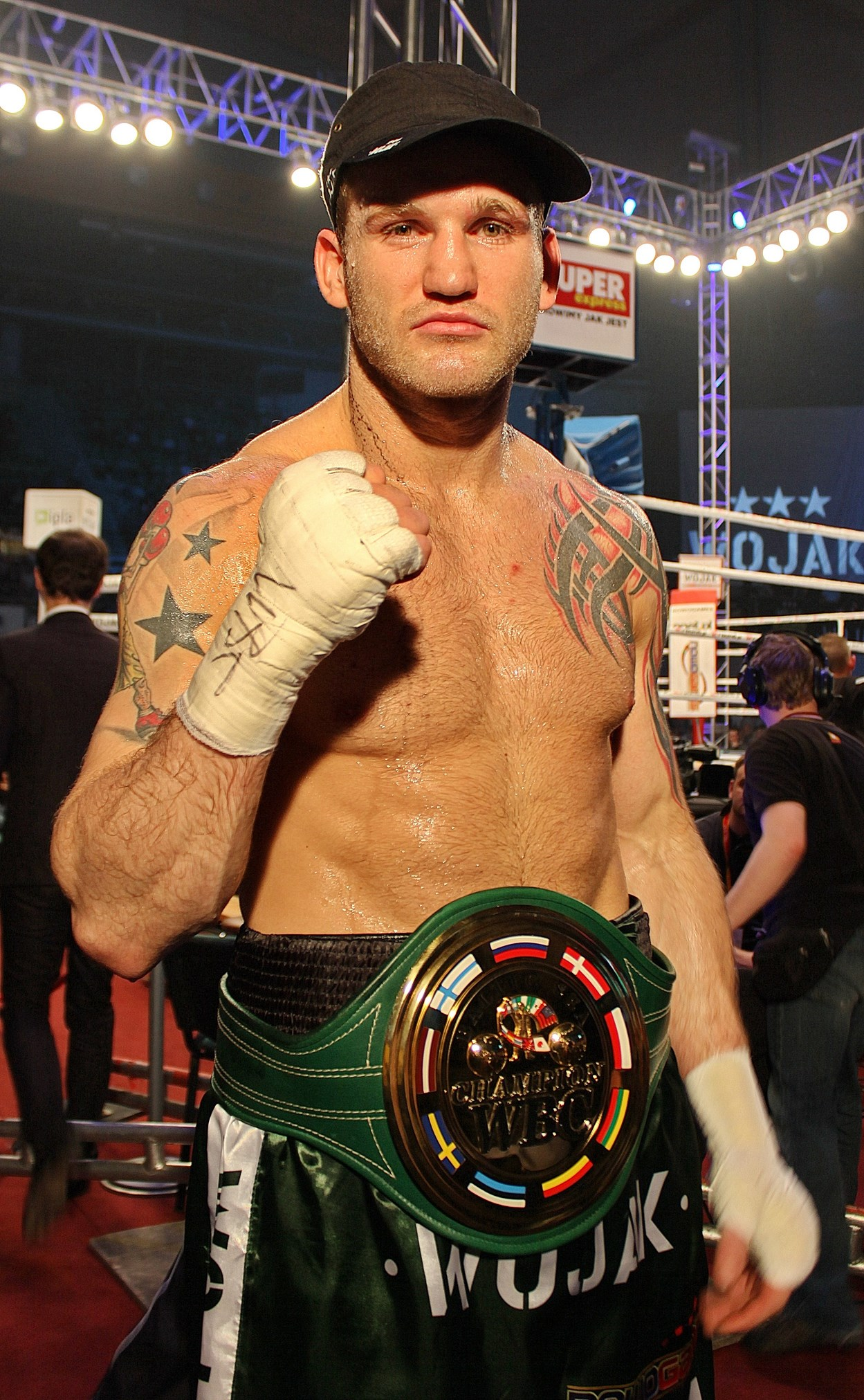

Personal information
- Nickname: Lucky Look
- Nationality: Polish
- Born: 17 December 1985 (age 40) Jelenia Góra, Poland
- Height: 191 cm (6 ft 3 in)
- Weight: Cruiserweight

Boxing career

Boxing record
- Total fights: 32
- Wins: 28
- Win by KO: 15
- Losses: 4
- Draws: 0

Łukasz Janik (born 17 December 1985) is a Polish Cruiserweight professional boxer.

== Career ==
On 2 November 2013, Janik fought Ola Afolabi for the vacant IBO Cruiserweight title, but lost by majority decision.

On 22 May 2015, Janik loss to WBC Cruiserweight champion Grigory Drozd in his first world title fight.

== Professional boxing record ==
28 Wins (15 knockouts, 13 decisions), 3 Losses (2 knockout), 0 Draws
Res.	Record	Opponent	Type	Rd., Time	Date	Location	Notes
Loss	28-4	(Poland) Adam Balski	KO	4 (8)	2017-06-24	Ergo Arena, Gdańsk, Poland	
Loss	28-3	(Russia) Grigory Drozd	TKO	9 (12)	2015-05-22	Luzhniki, Moscow, Russia	For WBC Cruiserweight title.
Win	28-2	(Argentina) Franco Raul Sanchez	KO	7 (8)	2014-12-05	Kopalnia Soli, Wieliczka, Poland	
Win	27-2	(United States) Rico Hoye	UD	10	2014-06-28	Hala na Podpromiu, Rzeszów, Poland	
Loss	26-2	(United Kingdom) Ola Afolabi	MD	12	2013-11-02	Madison Square Garden, New York, United States	For IBO World Cruiserweight title
Win	26-1	(Poland) Lukasz Rusiewicz	UD	6	2013-06-15	Hala Luczniczka, Bydgoszcz, Poland	
Win	25-1	(Germany) Lars Buchholz	UD	10	2013-03-23	Hala Sportowa, Częstochowa, Poland	
Win	24-1	(Belgium) Ismail Abdoul	UD	8	2012-12-08	Spodek, Katowice, Poland	
Win	23-1	(Czech Republic) Roman Kracík	KO	2 (8)	2012-09-22	Hala Stulecia, Wrocław, Poland	
Win	22-1	(Italy) Cristian Dolzanelli	KO	2 (10)	2011-04-02	Hala Luczniczka, Bydgoszcz, Poland	Win WBC Baltic Silver Cruiserweight title
Win	21-1	(Germany) Prince Anthony Ikeji	KO	1 (6)	2010-10-23	Hotel Hilton, Warsaw, Poland	
Win	20-1	(Hungary) Gabor Halasz	UD	8	2010-06-12	Krynica Zdrój, Poland	
Win	19-1	(Italy) Michele De Meo	KO	4 (8)	2010-05-15	Atlas Arena, Łódź, Poland	
Win	18-1	(Lithuania) Mantas Tarvydas	TKO	2 (8)	2010-04-24	Hala Sportowa, Gdynia, Poland	
Win	17-1	(Hungary) Krisztian Jaksi	UD	6	2010-02-06	Hala na Podpromiu, Rzeszów, Poland	
Win	16-1	(Hungary) Istvan Orsos	TKO	1 (6)	2009-12-18	MOSiR Hall, Łódź, Poland	
Loss	15-1	(Poland) Mateusz Masternak	TKO	5 (10)	2009-10-24	Atlas Arena, Łódź, Poland	
Win	15-0	(Germany) Silvio Meinel	RTD	2 (8)	2009-06-20	Targowisko Miejskie, Ruda Śląska, Poland	
Win	14-0	(Germany) Marcel Erler	RTD	2 (6)	2009-05-02	Halle 7, Bremen, Germany	
Win	13-0	(Lithuania) Remigijus Žiaušys	UD	8	2009-02-28	Lublin, Poland	
Win	12-0	(Canada) Martin Hudon	TKO	4 (4)	2009-01-30	Bell Centre, Montreal, Quebec, Canada	
Win	11-0	(Slovakia) Peter Oravec	TKO	1 (8)	2008-12-13	Hala MOSiR, Ketrzyn, Poland	
Win	10-0	(Belgium) Leon Nzama	UD	6	2008-05-17	Oberfrankenhalle, Bayreuth, Germany	
Win	9-0	(Belgium) Jean Claude Bikoi	UD	6	2008-03-29	Sparkassen-Arena, Kiel, Germany	
Win	8-0	(Russia) Andrey Zaitsev	UD	6	2008-02-16	Nuremberg Arena, Nuremberg, Germany	
Win	7-0	(Croatia) Sinisa Puljak	UD	6	2007-10-27	Messehalle, Erfurt, Germany	
Win	6-0	(France) Rachid El Hadak	MD	6	2007-08-18	Max Schmeling Halle, Prenzlauer Berg, Berlin, Germany	
Win	5-0	(Ukraine) Mahmud Otazhanov	TKO	5 (6)	2007-06-30	Olimpiyskiy, Moscow, Russia	
Win	4-0	(Latvia) Jevgēņijs Stamburskis	RTD	4 (6)	2007-05-26	Jako Arena, Bamberg, Germany	
Win	3-0	(Croatia) Tomislav Juric Grgic	TKO	2 (4)	2007-04-14	Porsche-Arena, Stuttgart, Germany	
Win	2-0	(France) Blanchard Kalambay	UD	4	2007-01-20	(Germany) St. Jakob Halle, Basel, Switzerland	
Win	1-0	(Belgium) Abdelhadi Hanine	TKO	3 (4)	2006-12-16	BigBox, Kempten, Germany	
