= Adam Balski =

Polish boxer (born 1990)

Personal information
- Born: 13 November 1990 (age 35) Kalisz, Poland
- Height: 6 ft 2 in (188 cm)
- Weight: Cruiserweight; Bridgerweight; Heavyweight

Boxing career
- Reach: 75 in (191 cm)
- Stance: Orthodox

Boxing record
- Total fights: 24
- Wins: 21
- Win by KO: 12
- Losses: 3
- No contests: 0

Adam Balski (born 13 November 1990) is a Polish professional boxer.

== Professional career ==
Balski made his professional debut on December 7, 2013 against Jakub Wójcik whom he would beat via a second-round knockout.

After racking up 5 wins in a row, he would face his first challenge in Valery Brudov. Balski would win via a fifth-round TKO.

Three fights later and accumulating a record of 9–0, he would face Łukasz Janik on the undercard of Tomasz Adamek vs. Solomon Haumono. Balski would win the fight via a fourth-round KO.

His first title fight would come on April 21, 2018, where he faced Russia's Denis Grachev for the vacant Republic of Poland international cruiserweight title. Balski would win the fight via Unanimous Decision.

After racking up a staggering 15–0 record, Balski faced Mateusz Masternak for the vacant IBF Inter-Continental cruiserweight title. Balski would lose the fight via Unanimous Decision and thus suffering his first career defeat.

Two fights later, Balski would face Alen Babić. Balski would lose this fight via Unanimous Decision and thus suffering his second career defeat.

Three fights later, Balski would face Artur Górski for the vacant WBC Francophone Bridgerweight title. This fight was in Balski's home town of Kalisz. Balski would win the fight in a controversial manner after a first round TKO.

After a ten month layoff, Balski would return to the ring against Argentina's Pablo Farias. Balski would win via a first-round TKO.

Eight months later, Balski would return in his biggest fight yet. He faced veteran boxer Krzysztof Włodarczyk for the interim WBC Bridgerweight title. Balski would lose the fight via a tenth-round knockout and thus suffering his first knockout loss.

== Professional boxing record ==
24 fights	21 wins	3 losses
By knockout	12	1
By decision	9	2

No.	Result	Record	Opponent	Type	Round, time	Date	Location	Notes
24	Win	21–3	Artur Kubiak	UD	6	4 Oct 2025	Nosalowy Dwór, Zakopane, Poland	
23	Loss	20–3	Krzysztof Włodarczyk	KO	10 (12) 2:35	25 May 2025	Arena Kalisz, Kalisz, Poland	For vacant WBC interim bridgerweight title.
22	Win	20–2	Pablo Farias	TKO	1 (8) 2:26	28 Sep 2024	Emily Resort, Lviv, Ukraine	
21	Win	19–2	Artur Górski	TKO	1 (10) 1:49	27 Jan 2024	Arena Kalisz, Kalisz, Poland	Won vacant WBC Francophone bridgerweight title.
20	Win	18–2	Michal Plesnik	UD	8	28 Jan 2023	Hala Sportowa, Nowy Sącz, Poland	
19	Win	17–2	Nicolas Holcapfel	KO	1 (6) 1:49	29 Oct 2022	Nosalowy Dwór, Zakopane, Poland	
18	Loss	16–2	Alen Babić	UD	10	21 May 2022	O2 Arena, London, England	
17	Win	16–1	Vadym Novopashyn	UD	8	17 Dec 2021	Hala WOSiR, Wyszków, Poland	
16	Loss	15–1	Mateusz Masternak	UD	10	30 May 2021	Hala Podpromie, Rzeszów, Poland	For vacant IBF Inter-Continental cruiserweight title
15	Win	15–0	Jarek Prusak	TKO	1 (6) 1:24	19 Sep 2020	Arena Jaskółka, Tarnów, Poland	
14	Win	14–0	Mateusz Kubiszyn	UD	6	25 Jul 2020	Amfiteatr Miejski, Augustów, Poland	
13	Win	13–0	Serhiy Radchenko	UD	8	22 Dec 2018	Hala MOSiR, Radom, Poland	
12	Win	12–0	Denis Grachev	UD	10	21 Apr 2018	Hala Sportowa, Częstochowa, Poland	Won vacant Republic of Poland International cruiserweight title.
11	Win	11–0	Demetrius Banks	UD	8	18 Nov 2017	Hala Sportowa, Częstochowa, Poland	
10	Win	10–0	Łukasz Janik	KO	4 (8) 2:18	24 Jun 2017	Ergo Arena, Gdańsk, Poland	
9	Win	9–0	Taras Oleksiyenko	KO	8 (8) 2:28	6 May 2017	Hala MOSiR, Ełk, Poland	
8	Win	8–0	Dariusz Skop	UD	8	3 Mar 2017	Hala Osrodka Sportu i Rekreacji, ul. Strumykowa 1, Dzierżoniów, Poland	
7	Win	7–0	Valery Brudov	TKO	5 (8) 2:53	24 Sep 2016	Arena Kalisz, Kalisz, Poland	
6	Win	6–0	Ihar Karavaeu	TKO	1 (6) 1:18	18 Jun 2016	Szydłowiec Castle, Szydłowiec, Poland	
5	Win	5–0	Łukasz Rusiewicz	UD	6	14 May 2016	Hala Azoty, Kędzierzyn-Koźle, Poland	
4	Win	4–0	Eryk Cieslowski	TKO	4 (6) 2:43	27 Feb 2016	Hala MOSiR, Radom, Poland	
3	Win	3–0	Krzysztof Chochel	TKO	1 (4) 1:43	9 Jan 2016	Thunder Gym, Tczew, Poland	
2	Win	2–0	Artsiom Hurbo	TKO	1 (4) 2:06	19 Dec 2015	Hala ICDS, Łomianki, Poland	
1	Win	1–0	Jakub Wójcik	KO	2 (4) 1:56	7 Dec 2013	York Hall, London, England	
