= Mateusz Masternak =

Polish boxer (born 1987)

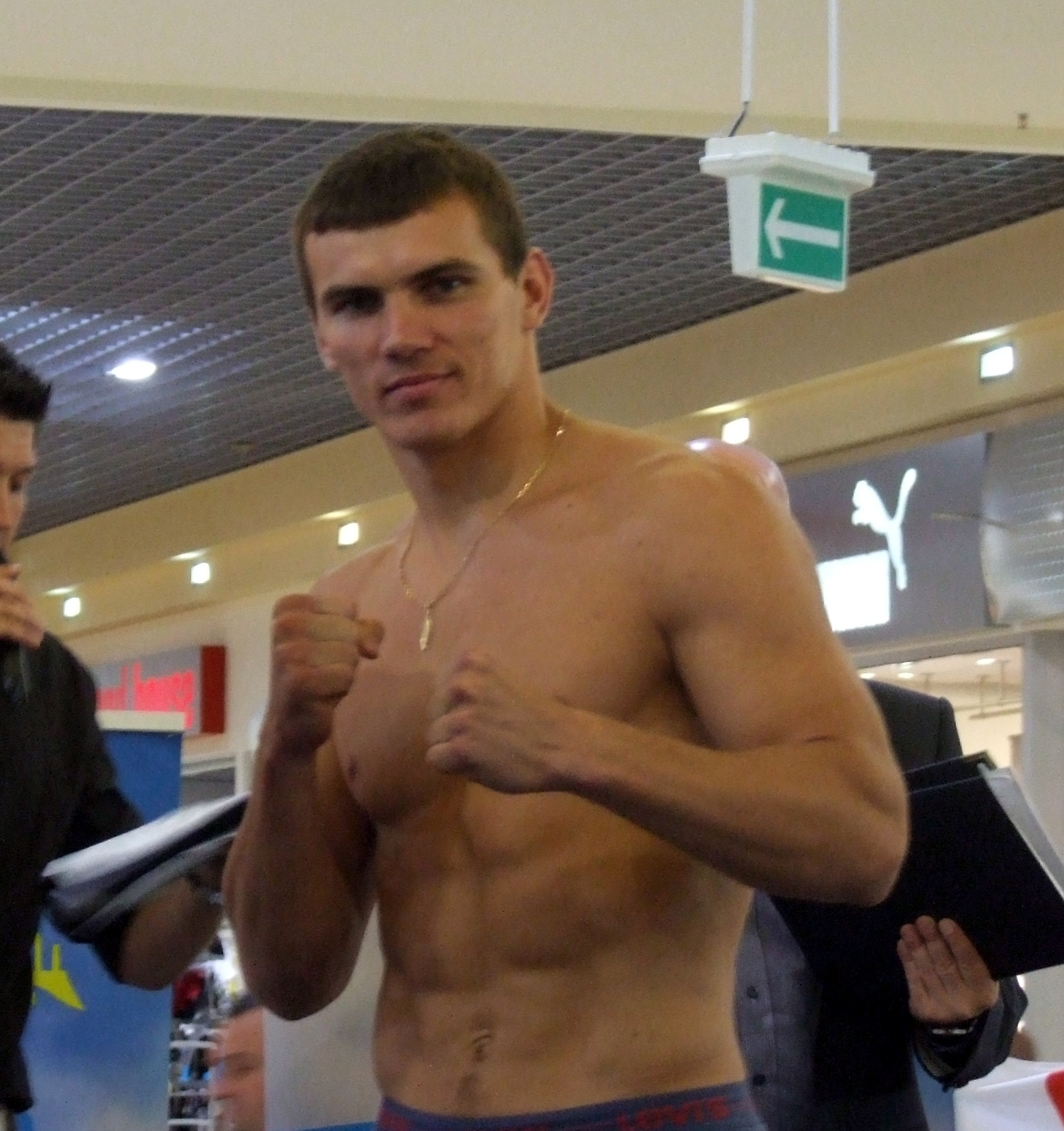

Personal information
- Nickname: Master
- Nationality: Polish
- Born: Mateusz Masternak; May 2, 1987 (age 39) Iwaniska, Poland
- Height: 6 ft 2 in (1.88 m)
- Weight: Cruiserweight

Boxing career
- Reach: 74 in (188 cm)
- Stance: Orthodox

Boxing record
- Total fights: 57
- Wins: 50
- Win by KO: 33
- Losses: 7

Mateusz Masternak (born 2 May 1987) is a Polish professional boxer fighting in the cruiserweight division. He is a former EBU and WBO European cruiserweight champion.

== Amateur career ==
Masternak had been living in Iwaniska until he finished primary school and junior high school. He started training boxing at the KSZO Ostrowiec Świętokrzyski club. At the age of 15 he moved to Wrocław where he started training at the Gwardia Wrocław club.

His first coaches in Gwardia were Mariusz Cieślak and Grzegorz Strugała. At the same time, Masternak joined Primary School No. 19 in Wrocław. His crucial year in amateur boxing was 2005, when he became the junior champion of Poland in Middleweight (75 kg). After the success he joined the national junior team.

His first fight in the national team took place in Tallinn during Junior Championship of Europe. Masternak was defeated in the quarter-final. In the same season, the young Pole won bronze medal during Championship of Poland. In the next year he finished second.

== Professional career ==
In March 2006, Masternak turned professional. Unbeaten in his first 28 fights, he beat Juho Haapoja on a unanimous decision at Arena Nürnberger Versicherung in Nuremberg, Germany, on 15 December 2012 to win the vacant European Boxing Union (EBU) cruiserweight title.

He lost the title in his first defense by 11th round technical knockout against Grigory Drozd on the undercard of Wladimir Klitschko vs. Alexander Povetkin at the Olympic Stadium in Moscow, Russia, on 5 October 2013.

Masternak unsuccessfully attempted to regain the now vacant title when he lost to Tony Bellew by unanimous decision at The O2 Arena in London, England, on 12 December 2015.

On 24 April 2018 at Hala Sportowa Częstochowa in Częstochowa, Poland, Masternak became WBO European cruiserweight champion when his opponent for the vacant title, Youri Kayembre Kalenga, retired at the end of round six.

On 20 October 2018, Masternak lost to Yuniel Dorticos via unanimous decision at CFE Arena in Orlando, Florida, USA, in the quarter-finals of the World Boxing Super Series cruiserweight tournament.

He challenged WBO cruiserweight champion, Chris Billam-Smith, at Bournemouth International Centre in Bournemouth, England, on 10 December 2023, losing when he retired in round eight because of a rib injury.

Masternak became a two-time EBU cruiserweight champion by knocking out Joel Tambwe Djeko in round seven of their fight for the vacant title at Nosalowy Dwór in Zakopane, Poland, on 4 October 2025.

He lost the title in his first defense against Viddal Riley on the undercard of Derek Chisora vs. Deontay Wilder at The O2 Arena in London, England, on 4 April 2026.

== Professional boxing record ==
57 fights	50 wins	7 losses
By knockout	33	2
By decision	17	5

No.	Result	Record	Opponent	Type	Round, time	Date	Location	Notes
57	Loss	50–7	(United Kingdom) Viddal Riley	UD	12	2026-04-04	(United Kingdom) The O2 Arena, London, England	Lost EBU cruiserweight title
56	Win	50–6	(Belgium) Joel Tambwe Djeko	KO	7(12), 2:01	2025-10-04	(Poland) Nosalowy Dwór, Zakopane	Won vacant EBU cruiserweight title
55	Win	49–6	(Australia) Floyd Masson	UD	10	2024-11-16	(Poland) KGHM Arena Ślęza Wrocław, Wrocław	Won vacant Republic of Poland International cruiserweight title
54	Win	48–6	(France) Jean Jacques Olivier	TKO	8(10), 1:23	2024-04-20	(Poland) KGHM Arena Ślęza Wrocław, Wrocław	
53	Loss	47–6	(United Kingdom) Chris Billam-Smith	RTD	8(12), 0:02	2023-12-10	(United Kingdom) Bournemouth International Centre, Bournemouth	For WBO cruiserweight title
52	Win	47–5	(Australia) Jason Whateley	UD	12	2022-10-29	(Poland) Nosalowy Dwór, Zakopane	
51	Win	46–5	(Kosovo) Armend Xhoxhaj	TKO	4(8), 3:00	2021-10-23	(Poland) Nosalowy Dwór, Zakopane	
50	Win	45–5	(Spain) Felipe Nsue	KO	3(10), 1:55	2021-08-29	(Poland) Amphitheatre Czos, Mragowo	
49	Win	44–5	(Poland) Adam Balski	UD	10	2021-05-30	(Poland) Hala Podpromie, Rzeszów	Won vacant IBF Inter-Continental cruiserweight title
48	Win	43–5	(Argentina) Jose Gregorio Ulrich	TKO	7(10), 0:13	2020-12-12	(Poland) DoubleTree by Hilton Hotel, Łódź	
47	Win	42–5	(Gabon) Taylor Mabika	UD	10	2020-09-19	(Poland) Arena Jaskółka, Tarnów	
46	Loss	41–5	(Cuba) Yuniel Dorticos	UD	12	2018-10-20	(United States) CFE Arena, Orlando, Florida	World Boxing Super Series: cruiserweight quarter-final
45	Win	41–4	(France) Youri Kayembre Kalenga	RTD	6 (12), 3:00	2018-04-21	(Poland) Hala Sportowa Częstochowa, Częstochowa	Won vacant WBO European Cruiserweight title.
44	Win	40–4	(Albania) Stivens Bujaj	TKO	7 (10), 1:23	2017-10-21	(United States) Prudential Center, Newark	Reserve bout for the WBSS: cruiserweight quarter-final.
43	Win	39–4	(Ukraine) Ismail Sillakh	UD	10	2017-06-24	(Poland) Ergo Arena, Gdańsk	
42	Win	38–4	(Russia) Alexander Kubich	UD	8	2017-03-04	(Poland) OSiR Hall, Dzierzoniow	
41	Win	37–4	(United States) Eric Fields	UD	10	2016-04-02	(Poland) Kraków Arena, Kraków	
40	Loss	36–4	(United Kingdom) Tony Bellew	UD	12	2015-12-12	(United Kingdom) The O2 Arena, Greenwich, London	For vacant EBU Cruiserweight title
39	Win	36–3	(Brazil) Carlos Ailton Nascimento	TKO	2 (12)	2015-09-05	(Germany) EnergieVerbund Arena, Dresden, Sachsen	Won WBA Inter-Continental cruiserweight title.
38	Loss	35–3	(South Africa) Johnny Muller	SD	10	2015-06-06	(South Africa) Emperor's Palace, Kempton Park, Gauteng	
37	Win	35–2	(Argentina) Ruben Angel Mino	TKO	2 (10), 1:23	2015-04-25	(Germany) Columbiahalle, Berlin	
36	Win	34–2	(France) Jean-Marc Mormeck	MD	10	2014-12-05	(France) Palais des sports, Issy-les-Moulineaux, Hauts-de-Seine	
35	Win	33–2	(Germany) Ben Nsafoah	KO	5 (8), 3:00	2014-09-27	(Germany) Sparkassen-Arena, Kiel, Schleswig-Holstein	
34	Loss	32–2	(France) Youri Kayembre Kalenga	SD	12	2014-06-21	(Monaco) Casino de Monte-Carlo, Monte Carlo	For interim WBA cruiserweight title.
33	Win	32–1	(Croatia) Stjepan Vugdelija	UD	8	2014-04-12	(Denmark) Blue Water Dokken, Esbjerg	
32	Win	31–1	(Georgia (country)) Sandro Siproshvili	KO	4 (8), 2:34	2014-02-01	(Denmark) Arena Nord, Frederikshavn	
31	Loss	30-1	(Russia) Grigory Drozd	TKO	11 (12), 0:53	2013-10-05	(Russia) Olimpiyskiy, Moscow	Lost EBU cruiserweight title.
30	Win	30–0	(Trinidad and Tobago) Shawn Corbin	TKO	9 (12), 1:01	2013-04-13	(Denmark) Arena Nord, Frederikshavn	Won WBC Silver International cruiserweight title.
29	Win	29–0	(Finland) Juho Haapoja	UD	12	2012-12-15	(Germany) Arena Nürnberger Versicherung, Nuremberg, Bayern	Won EBU cruiserweight title
28	Win	28–0	(Spain) David Quinonero	TKO	7 (10)	2012-09-15	(Germany) Stechert Arena, Bamberg, Bayern	
27	Win	27–0	(United Kingdom) Hari Miles	UD	10	2012-05-19	(Denmark) Parken, Copenhagen	
26	Win	26–0	(Mexico) Felipe Romero	TKO	10 (10), 2:06	2012-03-31	(Germany) Sparkassen-Arena, Kiel, Schleswig-Holstein	
25	Win	25–0	(United States) Michael Simms	TKO	4 (8), 1:16	2012-02-04	(Germany) Fraport Arena, Frankfurt am Main, Hessen	
24	Win	24–0	(United States) Carl Davis	TKO	3 (10), 2:46	2011-09-10	(Poland) Municipal Stadium, Wrocław	
23	Win	23–0	(Latvia) Arturs Kulikauskis	TKO	7 (8), 2:17	2011-06-25	(Poland) KSZO Hall, Ostrowiec Świętokrzyski	
22	Win	22–0	(Azerbaijan) Ali Ismailov	TKO	5 (12), 2:36	2011-03-11	(Poland) Urania Hall, Olsztyn	Retained IBO Inter-Continental Cruiserweight title.
21	Win	21–0	(Belgium) Ismail Abdoul	UD	12	2010-11-05	(Poland) MOSiR Sports Hall, Chełm	Won vacant IBO Inter-Continental Cruiserweight title.
20	Win	20–0	(Georgia (country)) Levan Jomardashvili	TKO	5 (10), 1:32	2010-06-19	(Poland) Legions Hall, Kielce	Won vacant interim WBC Youth Cruiserweight title.
19	Win	19–0	(Germany) Marco Heinichen	TKO	2 (8), 0:50	2010-04-17	(Germany) Bördelandhalle, Magdeburg, Sachsen-Anhalt	
18	Win	18–0	(France) Faisal Ibnel Arrami	TKO	8 (12), 1:46	2010-03-06	(Poland) Spodek, Katowice	Won vacant interim WBC Youth Cruiserweight title.
17	Win	17–0	(Germany) Tino Fröhlich	KO	2 (8), 2:38	2010-01-09	(Germany) Bördelandhalle, Magdeburg, Sachsen-Anhalt	
16	Win	16–0	(United States) Jameson Bostic	RTD	7 (10), 3:00	2009-12-19	(Poland) MOSiR Hall, Radom	Won vacant interim WBC Youth Cruiserweight title.
15	Win	15–0	(Poland) Łukasz Janik	TKO	5 (10), 2:30	2009-10-24	(Poland) Atlas Arena, Łódź	
14	Win	14–0	(Egypt) Mazur Ali	TKO	5 (8), 2:36	2009-07-11	(United States) Prudential Center, Newark, New Jersey	
13	Win	13–0	(Hungary) Laszlo Hubert	TKO	4 (10)	2009-02-14	(Poland) OSiR Hall, Grodzisk Mazowiecki	Won TWBA interim Cruiserweight title.
12	Win	12–0	(United States) Yavor Marinchev	PTS	8	2008-11-21	(Poland) OSiR Hall, Grodzisk Mazowiecki	
11	Win	11–0	(Germany) Alex Mogylewski	TKO	5 (10), 1:48	2008-10-03	(Poland) Globus Hall, Lublin	Won vacant interim WBC Youth Cruiserweight title.
10	Win	10–0	(Belarus) Artem Solomko	UD	8	2008-03-13	(Poland) OSiR Hall, Dzierzoniów	
9	Win	9–0	(Ukraine) Dmytro Sharypov	TKO	5 (6), 0:35	2007-12-15	(Poland) Best Western Hotel Mazurkas, Ożarów Mazowiecki	
8	Win	8–0	(Netherlands) Ronny Daniels	UD	6	2007-11-16	(Poland) Jaskółka, Tarnów	
7	Win	7–0	(Ukraine) Artem Shchehlov	UD	4	2007-10-18	(Poland) Hala Sportowo-Widowiskowa, Iława	
6	Win	6–0	(Ukraine) Taras Boyko	UD	6	2007-08-30	(Poland) OCSiR Hall, Ostróda	
5	Win	5–0	(Russia) Anton Krasnolutsky	TKO	4 (6)	2007-06-09	(Poland) Spodek, Katowice	
4	Win	4–0	(United States) William Chouloute	TKO	4 (4), 1:37	2006-10-20	(United States) Cicero Stadium, Cicero, Illinois	
3	Win	3–0	(United States) Jason Medina	TKO	1 (4), 1:48	2006-09-15	(United States) Aragon Ballroom, Chicago, Illinois	
2	Win	2–0	(United States) Gregory Holmes	TKO	3 (4), 1:09	2006-06-23	(United States) The Odeum, Villa Park, Illinois	
1	Win	1–0	(Slovakia) Anton Lascek	TKO	2 (4), 2:15	2006-06-03	(Poland) Arkadiusz Gołaś Hall, Ostrołęka	Professional debut.
