= Yuniel Dorticos =

Cuban boxer (born 1986)

Personal information
- Nickname: The KO Doctor
- Born: 11 March 1986 (age 40) Havana, Cuba
- Height: 6 ft 3 in (191 cm)
- Weight: Cruiserweight

Boxing career
- Reach: 80 in (203 cm)
- Stance: Orthodox

Boxing record
- Total fights: 30
- Wins: 27
- Win by KO: 25
- Losses: 3
Medal record
Men's amateur boxing
Representing Cuba
Cuban National Championships
Silver medal – second place	2006 Bayamo	Light-heavyweight
Silver medal – second place	2007 Sancti Spiritus	Light-heavyweight
Bronze medal – third place	2008 Holguin	Light-heavyweight
Bolivarian Games
Bronze medal – third place	2007 Guárico	Light-heavyweight
Strandzha Cup
Bronze medal – third place	2008 Plovdiv	Light-heavyweight
World Cadet Championships
Bronze medal – third place	2003 Bucharest	Middleweight

Yuniel Dorticós Pao (born 11 March 1986) is a Cuban professional boxer. He is a former cruiserweight world champion, having held the WBA (Regular) title from 2017 to 2018 and the IBF title from 2019 to 2020.

== Amateur career ==
He placed second three times in a row at the Cuban national championships from 2005- 2007 at light-heavyweight, each time behind Yusiel Nápoles. In 2008 he came in third, after losing to future Olympic gold medalist Julio César La Cruz in the semifinals. Dorticos represented Cuba twice in the Boxing World Cup.

=== World Cup results ===
2005 (light heavyweight)

- Defeated Elnur Kadyrov (Azerbaijan) RSC-3
- Defeated Ovidiu Chereches (Romania) RSC-2
- Lost to Yerdos Zhanabergenov (Kazakhstan) RSCI-2

2006 (light heavyweight)

- Defeated Erbol Dutbayev (Kazakhstan) RSC-OS
- Defeated Christopher Downs (United States) 39–19
- Defeated Javid Taghiev (Azerbaijan) RSC-OS
- Lost to Artur Beterbiev (Russia) RSC-1

== Professional career ==
=== Early career ===
Dorticos defected in 2009 and began a career in the paid ranks, fighting as a cruiserweight. Dorticos slowly worked his way up the ranks, fighting outmatched opponents. He won his first 17 fights by knockout (KO). In February 2014, Dorticos defeated Hamilton Ventura in his 16th professional fight. Dorticos completely overwhelmed Ventura, knocking him down three times before the referee stopped the fight. With the win, Dorticos broke into the top 15 of the WBA and WBC.

Dorticos was knocked down for the first time in the first round of a bout against Eric Fields. He was able to dust himself off and return the knockdown towards the end of that same round. Dorticos knocked out Fields at 2 minutes 59 seconds in round four. In April 2014, Dorticos would go the distance for the first time, as Edison Miranda was able to take his power. Nevertheless, Dorticos won a wide unanimous decision (100–90, 100–90, 99–91). Dorticos sought fights against Murat Gassiev, Beibut Shumenov, and Denis Lebedev but was ultimately unable to get any of them in the ring.

=== WBA interim cruiserweight champion ===
==== Dorticos vs. Kalenga ====
Dorticos became the mandatory to the WBA's champion Denis Lebedev following a win over Fulgencio Zúñiga. However, the WBA allowed Lebedev to unify against IBF title-holder Victor Emilio Ramírez before facing Dorticos. In turn, the WBA ordered Dorticos to fight Youri Kalenga for an interim championship. The fight was due for 20 May 2016 at the Palais des Sports in Paris. This would be Dorticos' first pro bout outside the United States.

In a thrilling fight, Dorticos stopped Kalenga in the tenth round via technical knockout (TKO) to become a world champion. Dorticos dropped Kalenga in the second round after a flurry of shots. Kalenga was able to recover and get back into the fight in the middle rounds, despite receiving a cut over one of his eyes during round six. Dorticos lost a point at the end of round eight for hitting after the bell. In round ten, Dorticos once again landed a flurry of punches on Kalenga, at which point the referee stopped the fight.

Following his victory, Dorticos entered a purse bid for a fight against WBA (Regular) champion Beibut Shumenov. The fight was delayed several times, due to promotional issues before being called off due to an eye injury that Shumenov suffered during sparring. In June 2017, Shumenov vacated his title due to that same injury. The WBA elevated Dorticos from interim champion to regular champion, despite Dorticos being away from the ring for over a year.

=== 2017–18 World Boxing Super Series ===
A day after being elevated to WBA (Regular) champion, Dorticos joined the World Boxing Super Series. The Super Series is a single-elimination tournament featuring 8 fighters from the cruiserweight division. The field includes title-holders from all 4 of boxing's major sanctioning bodies. Dorticos was revealed to be the tournament's 4th seed.

==== Dorticos vs. Kudryashov ====
On the tournament's draft, it was determined that Dorticos would face Dmitry Kudryashov in the quarterfinals. The fight was set for 23 September at the Alamodome in San Antonio, Texas. This will be the Super Series' first match in the United States. A percentage of the gate revenue will be donated to the San Antonio Food Bank to aid victims of Hurricane Harvey. At the official weigh-in, Dmitry Kudryashov initially missed weight by half a pound, coming in at 200 1/2 lbs. However, he was able to come in at exactly 200 lbs in a second try 45 minutes later. Dorticos weighed in at 199 lbs.

On fight night, Dorticos retained his title and advanced to the semi-finals by knocking out Kudryashov in two rounds. The fight started with a slow-paced, feel out round, with both boxers studying their opponent. Dorticos successfully executed a pull counter as the bell sounded. In round two, the pace of the fight increased, with Dorticos and Kudryashov trading combinations. Eventually, Dorticos gained the upper hand by landing a series of one-two combos, as Kudryashov retreated behind his high guard. Dorticos ended the contest by knocking out Kudryashov with a right hook. The referee waived the count with a minute left in round two. Dorticos is expected to face the winner of Gassiev-Włodarczyk and stated that he would prefer to face Gassiev.

=== 2018–19 World Boxing Super Series ===
==== Dorticos vs. Masternak ====
Dorticos participated in the 2018–19 World Boxing Super Series Cruiserweight tournament. It was announced that he would face the one-time WBA Interim cruiserweight title challenger Mateusz Masternak in the quarterfinal bout, which was held on October 20, 2018, at the CFE Arena in Orlando, Florida. Masternak was ranked #4 by the WBA, #6 by the WBO, #8 by the IBF and #11 WBC. The fight was scheduled as the main event of a DAZN card. Dorticos was expected to beat Masternak, and came into the fight as the betting favorite. He won the fight by unanimous decision, with two judges awarding him a 115–113 scorecard, while the third judge scored it 116–112 in his favor.

==== Dorticos vs. Tabiti ====
Dorticos advanced to the tournament semifinals, where was set to face the reigning IBF titleholder Andrew Tabiti, who earned his berth with a unanimous decision victory against Ruslan Fayfer. The fight was scheduled as the co-main event of a DAZN card held on June 15, 2019, at the Arēna Rīga in Rīga, Latvia. Tabiti was ranked #1 by the IBF, #2 by the WBA and WBC and #6 by the WBO. Tabiti was confident in his ability to beat Dorticos during the pre-fight interviews, stating: "I’ve watched his fights, I think it is fair to say that he is flat-footed. He’s one dimensional in the sense that he relies on his knockout punch, he can’t really box". The close nature of the bout was reflected in the betting lines, which saw Dorticos as the -197 favorite and Tabiti as the +172 underdog. Dorticos won the fight by a tenth-round knockout, flooring Tabiti with a well placed right hand, which left him unable to rise from the canvas for several minutes afterwards.

==== Dorticos vs. Briedis ====
Dorticos was scheduled to face the former WBO cruiserweight titlist Mairis Briedis in the WBSS tournament finals. The bout was originally supposed to be a title unification bout, however, Briedis was stripped of his title as he refused to rematch Krzysztof Glowacki. The Dorticos and Briedis clash was scheduled as the main event of a DAZN card held on March 21, 2020, at the Arēna Rīga in Rīga, Latvia. Briedis was ranked #6 by the IBF at cruiserweight. The developing COVID-19 pandemic forced the WBSS to postpone the bout on March 14, 2020. The fight was postponed until May 16. On April 15, 2020, the fight was once again postponed, this time for September 26, 2020. Briedis won the fight by majority decision, with two judges awarding him a 117–111 scorecard, while the third judge scored it as a 114–114 draw. Dorticos had a good start to the fight, but flagged as the fight progressed, with Briedis landing the more damaging shots.

=== Continued cruiserweight career ===
Dorticos faced Jesse Bryan on November 20, 2021, at the Manual Artime Community Center Theater in Miami, Florida. He won the fight by a second-round technical knockout, after knocking Bryan down twice in the first round.

== Professional boxing record ==
30 fights	27 wins	3 losses
By knockout	25	1
By decision	2	2

No.	Result	Record	Opponent	Type	Round, time	Date	Location	Notes
30	Loss	27–3	Gilberto Ramírez	UD	12	28 Jun 2025	Honda Center, Anaheim, California, U.S.	For WBA (Super) and WBO cruiserweight titles
29	Win	27–2	Alan Campa	KO	1 (10), 1:00	7 Jun 2024	Seminole Hard Rock Hotel and Casino, Hollywood, Florida, U.S.	
28	Win	26–2	Deibis Berrocal	TKO	2 (6), 0:30	18 Dec 2022	Coco Locos Restaurant Sports Bar, Sosua, Dominican Republic	
27	Win	25–2	Jesse Bryan	TKO	2 (10), 0:35	20 Nov 2021	Manual Artime Community Center Theater, Miami, Florida, U.S.	
26	Loss	24–2	Mairis Briedis	MD	12	26 Sep 2020	Plazamedia Broadcasting Center, Munich, Germany	Lost IBF cruiserweight title; For vacant The Ring cruiserweight title; World Boxing Super Series: Cruiserweight final
25	Win	24–1	Andrew Tabiti	KO	10 (12), 2:33	15 Jun 2019	Arēna Rīga, Rīga, Latvia	Won vacant IBF cruiserweight title; World Boxing Super Series: Cruiserweight semi-final
24	Win	23–1	Mateusz Masternak	UD	12	20 Oct 2018	Addition Financial Arena, Orlando, Florida, U.S.	World Boxing Super Series: Cruiserweight quarter-final
23	Loss	22–1	Murat Gassiev	TKO	12 (12), 2:52	3 Feb 2018	Bolshoy Ice Dome, Sochi, Russia	Lost WBA cruiserweight title; For IBF cruiserweight title; World Boxing Super Series: Cruiserweight semi-final
22	Win	22–0	Dmitry Kudryashov	KO	2 (12), 2:10	23 Sep 2017	Alamodome, San Antonio, Texas, U.S.	Retained WBA (Regular) cruiserweight title; World Boxing Super Series: Cruiserweight quarter-final
21	Win	21–0	Youri Kayembre Kalenga	TKO	10 (12), 2:54	20 May 2016	Palais des Sports, Paris, France	Won vacant WBA interim cruiserweight title
20	Win	20–0	Fulgencio Zuniga	TKO	2 (10), 1:44	12 Dec 2015	Ring of Dreams Boxing Gym, Winston-Salem, North Carolina, U.S.	
19	Win	19–0	Galen Brown	TKO	1 (10), 2:29	17 Jul 2015	Kissimmee Civic Center, Kissimmee, Florida, U.S.	Retained WBC Latino cruiserweight title
18	Win	18–0	Edison Miranda	UD	10	10 Jul 2014	American Airlines Arena, Miami, Florida, U.S.	Retained WBC Latino cruiserweight title
17	Win	17–0	Eric Fields	KO	4 (10), 2:59	16 Apr 2014	Barker Hangar, Santa Monica, California, U.S.	Retained WBC Latino, and WBA interim Fedalatin cruiserweight titles
16	Win	16–0	Hamilton Ventura	TKO	1 (10), 2:19	28 Feb 2014	Crowne Plaza Hotel, San Diego, California, U.S.	Won WBA interim Fedelatin cruiserweight title; Retained WBC Latino cruiserweight title
15	Win	15–0	Keith Barr	KO	2 (8), 1:19	13 Jul 2013	Hollywood Park Casino, Inglewood, California, U.S.	
14	Win	14–0	Willie Herring	RTD	3 (6), 3:00	22 Feb 2013	Community Center, Palm Bay, Florida, U.S.	
13	Win	13–0	Livin Castillo	TKO	3 (10), 1:05	18 Nov 2011	Miami Airport Convention Center, Miami, Florida, U.S.	Won vacant WBC Latino cruiserweight title
12	Win	12–0	Jose Luis Herrera	TKO	2 (4), 2:36	25 Mar 2011	Cosmopolitan Resort, Paradise, Nevada, U.S.	
11	Win	11–0	Epifanio Mendoza	TKO	6 (6), 2:32	4 Mar 2011	Jostens Center, Lake Buena Vista, Florida, U.S.	
10	Win	10–0	Gustavo Enriquez	TKO	1 (6), 1:18	3 Dec 2010	Magic City Casino, Miami, Florida, U.S.	
9	Win	9–0	Robert Turner	TKO	1 (4), 1:40	15 Oct 2010	A La Carte Event Pavilion, Tampa, Florida, U.S.	
8	Win	8–0	Tony Kern	KO	1 (4), 0:55	24 Sep 2010	Paragon Casino, Marksville, Louisiana, U.S.	
7	Win	7–0	Hilario Guzman	TKO	3 (4), 1:30	18 Aug 2010	Civic Center, Monroe, Louisiana, U.S.	
6	Win	6–0	Maurice Winslow	TKO	1 (4), 0:35	9 Jul 2010	Club Europe, Atlanta, Georgia, U.S.	
5	Win	5–0	Carlos Reyes	TKO	1 (4), 1:53	30 Apr 2010	Convention Center, Miami, Florida, U.S.	
4	Win	4–0	Zack Zeigler	KO	1 (4), 1:24	10 Apr 2010	Bank Atlantic Center, Sunrise, Florida, U.S.	
3	Win	3–0	Gary Lavender	TKO	1 (4), 1:44	5 Feb 2010	NSU Arena, Fort Lauderdale, Florida, U.S.	
2	Win	2–0	George Nowell	TKO	1 (4), 1:23	4 Dec 2009	La Covacha, Miami, Florida, U.S.	
1	Win	1–0	Hilario Guzman	TKO	4 (4), 1:20	14 Aug 2009	Miccosukee Indian Gaming Resort, Miami, Florida, U.S.	

== See also ==
- List of cruiserweight boxing champions

Sporting positions
Regional boxing titles
Vacant Title last held by Éric Molina	WBC Latino cruiserweight champion 18 November 2011 – 2013	Vacant Title next held by Santander Silgado
Vacant Title last held by Mariano Strunz	WBC Latino cruiserweight champion Interim title 28 February 2014 – June 2014; Promoted	Vacant Title next held by Cristian Medina
Vacant Title last held by Isiah Thomas	WBA Fedelatin cruiserweight champion Interim title 28 February 2014 – June 2014	Vacant
Vacant Title last held by Garrett Wilson	IBF-USBA cruiserweight champion 16 April 2014 – 2015	Vacant Title next held by Isiah Thomas
Vacant Title last held by Santander Silgado	WBC Latino cruiserweight champion 10 July 2014 – December 2015	Vacant Title next held by Jose Ulrich
World boxing titles
Preceded by Beibut Shumenov as co-titlist until 21 May 2016	WBA cruiserweight champion Interim title 20 May 2016 – 20 June 2017; Promoted	Vacant Title next held by Arsen Goulamirian
Preceded by Beibut Shumenov stripped	WBA cruiserweight champion Regular title 20 June 2017 – 1 February 2018; Promoted	Vacant Title next held by Beibut Shumenov
Preceded by Denis Lebedev as Super champion	WBA cruiserweight champion 1 February 2018 – 3 February 2018; Lost bid for Unified title	Succeeded by Murat Gassiev as Unified champion
Vacant Title last held by Oleksandr Usyk	IBF cruiserweight champion 15 June 2019 – 26 September 2020	Succeeded by Mairis Briedis
