= Murat Gassiev vs. Krzysztof Włodarczyk =

Boxing match

- Date: October 21, 2017
- Venue: Prudential Center, Newark, U.S.
- Title(s) on the line: IBF cruiserweight title

Tale of the tape
Boxer	(Russia) Murat Gassiev	(Poland) Krzysztof Włodarczyk
Nickname	"Iron"	"Diablo"
Hometown	Vladikavkaz, North Caucasian, Russia	Warsaw, Masovian, Poland
Pre-fight record	24–0 (1) (18 KO)	53–3–1 (37 KO)
Age	24 years	36 years, 1 month
Height	6 ft 4 in (193 cm)	6 ft 1 in (185 cm)
Weight	199 lb (90 kg)	199 1/2 lb (90 kg)
Style	Orthodox	Orthodox
Recognition	IBF; Cruiserweight Champion; The Ring/TBRB; No. 2 Ranked Cruiserweight	IBF; No. 1 Ranked Cruiserweight; TBRB; No. 4 Ranked Cruiserweight; The Ring; No. 10 Ranked Cruiserweight

Result
- Gassiev defeats Włodarczyk in the 3rd round via KO

Murat Gassiev vs. Krzysztof Włodarczyk was a professional boxing match contested on October 21, 2017, for the IBF cruiserweight championship.

== Background ==
At the WBSS Draft Gala, which took place on 8 July in Monte Carlo, although Gassiev was second-seeded, meaning he could pick whom he wanted to fight, his choice was pre-determined to be former IBF and WBC cruiserweight champion Krzysztof Włodarczyk by the IBF, in a mandatory fight. It was announced on 8 September that the fight would take place in Newark, New Jersey, at the Prudential Center on 21 October 2017. One of the main factors for the fight taking place in New Jersey was the Polish population in that state.

== The fight ==
Gassiev was in control the opening two rounds working away on Włodarczyk. Midway through round 3, having Włodarczyk against the ropes, Gassiev connected with a left uppercut to the head, which was immediately followed by a left to the body, dropping Włodarczyk on all fours, flat on the canvas. Włodarczyk, clearly in pain, failed to beat the 10 count. The official time of stoppage was 1:57 of the round.

== Aftermath ==
Gassiev, who was pleased with his performance, said, "I had a great opponent tonight. I prepared myself for a tough fight, but it is boxing, and anything can happen. We do a lot of work in the gym, and I just listened to my coach round after round, and he told me what I needed to do. That's all I needed." Włodarczyk accepted defeat admitting the better man won.

With the win, Gassiev moved on to the semifinals to face fellow seed Yuniel Dorticos, who entered the ring and faced off with Gassiev.

== Undercard ==
Confirmed bouts:

== Broadcasting ==
Country	Broadcaster
Baltic & Nordic countries	Viasat
Belgium	VOO
Bulgaria	Nova
Canada	Super Channel
Germany	SAT.1
Russia	Match! Boets
Singapore	StarHub
Sub-Saharan Africa	TVMS
Turkey	Tivibu Sports
United Kingdom	ITV
United States	Audience
Ukraine	Inter

Preceded by vs. Denis Lebedev	Murat Gassiev's bouts 21 October 2017	Succeeded by vs. Yuniel Dorticos
Preceded by vs. Noel Gevor	Krzysztof Włodarczyk's bouts 21 October 2017	Succeeded by vs. Adam Gadajew
