= Fulgencio Zúñiga =

Colombian boxer (born 1977)

Personal information
- Nationality: Colombian
- Born: Fulgencio Zúñiga; July 23, 1977 (age 49) Padilla, Cauca, Colombia
- Height: 5 ft 10 in (178 cm)
- Weight: Light heavyweight Super middleweight Middleweight; Light middleweight

Boxing career
- Reach: 70 in (178 cm)
- Stance: Orthodox

Boxing record
- Total fights: 46
- Wins: 28
- Win by KO: 25
- Losses: 17
- Draws: 1

Fulgencio Zúñiga (Spanish pronunciation: [fulˈxensjo ˈsuɲiɣa]; born July 23, 1977) is a Colombian professional boxer and former IBO super middleweight champion.

== Early career ==
Fulgencio Zúñiga made his first national appearance in 1997 in the 48th National Boxing Tournament held in the city of Bucaramanga, Santander, where he claimed the gold medal in the super middleweight division. In the same year of 1997 he participated in the following tournaments:

- 13th Bolivarian Games. Arequipa, Peru. Gold Medalist.
- Central American Boxing Championship. Tijuana, Mexico. Silver Medalist.
- 4th Pan-American Boxing Championship. Medellín, Colombia.

During 1998 and 1999 Fulgencio Zúñiga continued his impressive amateur boxing career by winning the 49th National Boxing Tournament held in Santa Marta, Magdalena, thus becoming a two-time national champion. Then he represented Colombia in the following championships:

- 6th South American Games (a.k.a. Odesur Games). Cuenca, Ecuador. Gold Medalist.
- Roberto Balado Cup. Havana, Cuba. Bronze Medalist.
- 6th South American Championship. Quito, Ecuador.
- Córdoba Cardín Tournament. Havana, Cuba.

== Professional ==
Zúñiga turned pro on February 11, 2001, when he faced Manuel Cabarcas in Barranquilla, scoring a TKO in round one. From March 2001 to November 2002 he faced fourteen opponents, all of whom were knocked out in the first rounds. On June 28, 2003, he faced Daniel Santos of San Juan, Puerto Rico, who eventually outpointed the Colombian fighter. Then Zúñiga faced better opponents, such as former IBC middleweight champion José Luis Zertuche; three-time middleweight championship challenger Antwun Echols; New Yorker George Walton, and highly regarded Kelly Pavlik. After defeating Zúñiga, "The Ghost" Pavlik said: "This is the toughest fight I have ever fought. I don’t know if anyone in the middleweight division could fight this guy [Zúñiga] at this pace."

== Professional boxing record (incomplete) ==
43 fights, 28 wins (25 knockouts), 14 losses (7 knockouts), 1 draw
Result	Record	Opponent	Type	Round, time	Date	Location	Notes
Loss	28-14-1	(Belgium) Joel Tambwe Djeko	KO	1 (8), 0:25	2017-04-01	Brussels, Belgium	
Win	28-13-1	(Colombia) Javier Meza	KO	1 (8), 1:30	2017-02-24	(Colombia) Barrio La Magdalena, Barranquilla	
Loss	27-13-1	(Russia) Ruslan Fayfer	KO	1 (8)	2016-11-12	(France) Palais des Sports René-Bougnol, Montpellier	
Loss	27-12-1	(Cuba) Yuniel Dorticos	TKO	2 (10)	2015-12-12	(United States) Ring of Dreams Boxing Gym, Winston-Salem, USA	
Loss	27-11-1	(United States) Sean Monaghan	TKO	9 (10)	2015-06-13	(United States) Madison Square Garden Theater, New York, New York, USA	
Loss	27-10-1	(Mexico) Gilberto Ramirez	TKO	8 (10)	2014-11-15	(United States) Alamodome, San Antonio, Texas, USA	
Win	27-9-1	(Venezuela) Jesus Bermudez	TKO	2 (6)	2014-06-20	Centro Recreacional Las Vegas, Barranquilla, Colombia	
Loss	26-9-1	(Cameroon) Hassan N'Dam N'Jikam	UD	10	2014-04-16	(United States) Barker Hangar, Santa Monica, California	
Win	26-8-1	(Colombia) Oney Valdez	TKO	3 (6), 1:45	2014-02-13	(Colombia) Centro Recreacional Las Vegas, Barranquilla	
Loss	25-8-1	(Colombia) Alejandro Berrio	UD	10	2013-11-01	(Colombia) Coliseo Bernardo Caraballo, Cartagena	For WBC Latino light heavyweight title
Loss	25-7-1	(United Kingdom) James DeGale	UD	12	2012-12-08	(England) Bonus Arena, Kingston upon Hull, Yorkshire	
Loss	25-6-1	(South Africa) Thomas Oosthuizen	UD	12	2012-11-10	(South Africa) Emperor's Palace, Kempton Park, Gauteng	For IBO super middleweight title
Win	25-5-1	(Colombia) Alejandro Berrio	KO	7 (10), 0:57	2012-07-19	(Colombia) Coliseo Bernardo Caraballo, Cartagena	
Loss	25-5-1	(United States) Tavoris Cloud	UD	12	2010-12-17	(United States) American Airlines Arena, Miami, Florida	For IBF light heavyweight title
Win	25-4-1	(Colombia) Anibal Miranda	TKO	3 (8), 2:01	2012-07-19	(Colombia) Coliseo Kid Dumlop, Santa Marta	
Win	24-4-1	(Colombia) Jose Chiquillo	TKO	2 (10)	2009-08-15	Puerto Colombia	
Loss	23-4-1	(Romania) Lucian Bute	TKO	4 (12), 2:25	2009-03-13	(Canada) Bell Centre, Montreal, Quebec	For IBF super middleweight title
Win	23-3-1	(Colombia) Diego Castillo	KO	3 (10)	2008-11-13	(Colombia) Estadio Metropolitano, Barranquilla	
Loss	22-3-1	(Russia) Denis Inkin	UD	12	2008-09-27	(Germany) Color Line Arena, Altona, Hamburg	For vacant WBO super middleweight title
Win	23-2-1	(Colombia) Elias Ruiz	KO	2 (10), 2:46	2008-08-16	(Colombia) Coliseo Menor de Villa Olímpica, Santa Marta	
Win	22-2-1	(Australia) Victor Oganov	TKO	9 (12), 1:25	2007-09-01	(United States) Emerald Queen Casino, Tacoma, Washington	Won vacant IBO super middleweight title
Win	21-2-1	(United States) Antwun Echols	UD	10	2007-06-23	(United States) Thomas & Mack Center, Las Vegas, Nevada	
Win	20-2-1	(Mexico) José Luis Zertuche	SD	10	2006-09-14	(United States) Orleans Hotel & Casino, Las Vegas, Nevada	
Loss	19-2-1	(United States) Kelly Pavlik	TKO	9 (12), 3:00	2005-10-07	(United States) The Aladdin, Las Vegas, Nevada	

Achievements
Vacant Title last held by Jeff Lacy	IBO super middleweight champion September 1, 2007 – 2008; Vacated	Vacant Title next held by Sakio Bika
