= Youri Kalenga =

French boxer

Personal information
- Nickname: El Torro ("The Bull")
- Nationality: Congolese; French
- Born: Youri Kayembe Kalenga; 27 March 1988 (age 38) Kinshasa, Zaire (now Democratic Republic of the Congo)
- Height: 6 ft 0 in (183 cm)
- Weight: Cruiserweight

Boxing career
- Reach: 73 in (185 cm)
- Stance: Orthodox

Boxing record
- Total fights: 34
- Wins: 27
- Win by KO: 20
- Losses: 7

Youri Kayembre Kalenga (born March 27, 1988) is a Congolese-French professional boxer. He is the former WBA interim Cruiserweight champion.

== Professional career ==
On June 21, 2014, Kalenga defeated Mateusz Masternak by twelfth round split decision to win the interim WBA Cruiserweight title.

In May 2016 Kalenga was stopped by Yuniel Dorticos in the 10th round in a fight for the vacant interim WBA title.

== Professional boxing record ==
34 fights	27 wins	7 losses
By knockout	20	3
By decision	7	4

No.	Result	Record	Opponent	Type	Round, time	Date	Location	Notes
34	Loss	27–7	Noel Mikaelian	UD	12	2022-02-12	Studio 69, Riga, Latvia	For vacant WBC Silver cruiserweight title
33	Win	27–6	Mikheil Khutsishvili	KO	1 (6)	2021-07-17	Stade du Heysel, Brussels, Belgium	
32	Win	26–6	Michal Plesnik	KO	9 (10)	2021-04-23	Olivia Business Centre, Gdańsk, Poland	Won vacant WBC Francophone cruiserweight title
31	Win	25–6	Ermin Avdic	TKO	2 (8)	2019-11-02	Mariakerke, Belgium	
30	Loss	24–6	Michał Cieślak	RTD	7 (8)	2019-03-01	Legionowo Arena, Legionowo, Poland	
29	Win	24–5	Soso Abuladze	TKO	2 (6)	2018-10-20	Canal Olympia, Dakar, Senegal	
28	Loss	23–5	Mateusz Masternak	RTD	6 (12)	2018-04-21	Hala Sportowa, Częstochowa, Poland	For vacant WBO European cruiserweight title
27	Loss	23–4	Kevin Lerena	SD	12	2017-09-09	Emperors Palace, Kempton Park, South Africa	For vacant IBO cruiserweight title
26	Win	23–3	Adam Gadajew	TKO	4 (8)	2017-03-31	Institut national du judo, Paris, France	
25	Loss	22–3	Yuniel Dorticos	TKO	10 (12)	2016-05-20	Dôme de Paris, Paris, France	For Interim WBA cruiserweight title
24	Win	22–2	Roberto Bolonti	KO	9 (10)	2015-11-07	Monte-Carlo Sporting, Monte Carlo, Monaco	
23	Loss	21–2	Denis Lebedev	UD	12	2015-04-10	Luzhniki Palace of Sports, Moscow, Russia	For WBA cruiserweight title
22	Win	21–1	Denton Daley	TKO	12 (12)	2014-11-15	Hershey Centre, Mississauga, Canada	Retained Interim WBA cruiserweight title
21	Win	20–1	Mateusz Masternak	SD	12	2014-06-21	Salle Gaston Médecin, Fontvieille, Monaco	Won Interim WBA cruiserweight title
20	Win	19–1	Cesar David Crenz	KO	3 (10)	2014-02-15	National Stadium, Dublin, Ireland	
19	Win	18–1	Hari Miles	TKO	8 (10)	2013-12-21	Pabellon Esperanza Lag, Elche, Spain	
18	Win	17–1	Giorgi Tevdorashvili	TKO	2 (8)	2013-11-02	Salle Georges Carpentier, Loon-Plage, France	
17	Loss	16–1	Arturs Kulikauskis	UD	10	2013-09-14	Kipsala Exhibition Centre, Riga, Latvia	For vacant Latvian cruiserweight title
16	Win	16–0	Iago Kiladze	KO	2 (10)	2013-06-08	Max-Schmeling-Halle, Berlin, Germany	
15	Win	15–0	Jiri Svacina	TKO	2 (6)	2013-04-13	Salle des Huttes, Gravelines, France	
14	Win	14–0	József Nagy	KO	2 (6)	2012-11-30	Salle Japy, Paris, France	
13	Win	13–0	Jindrich Velecky	UD	6	2012-11-16	Salle Calypso, Calais, France	
12	Win	12–0	Prince Anthony Ikeji	TKO	2 (6)	2012-05-04	Palais des sports, Levallois-Perret, France	
11	Win	11–0	Martial Bella Oleme	PTS	10	2012-04-21	Salle des Huttes, Gravelines, France	
10	Win	10–0	Remigijus Ziausys	UD	6	2012-03-31	Salle Jean Mace, Issoudun, France	
9	Win	9–0	Attila Palko	KO	1 (6)	2011-12-03	Salle Robert Pruvot, Grand-Fort-Philippe, France	
8	Win	8–0	Remigijus Ziausys	PTS	6	2011-10-28	Salle Georges Carpentier, Loon-Plage, France	
7	Win	7–0	David Radeff	TKO	2 (6)	2011-07-01	Salle des Huttes, Gravelines, France	
6	Win	6–0	Isossa Mondo	KO	1 (6)	2011-04-09	Salle Jean Mace, Issoudun, France	
5	Win	5–0	Valerijs Gubins	TKO	1 (6)	2011-02-12	Salle des Huttes, Gravelines, France	
4	Win	4–0	Isossa Mondo	PTS	6	2010-12-04	Salle Norbert Merlin, Gravelines, France	
3	Win	3–0	David Radeff	RTD	2 (6)	2010-10-23	Salle Robert Pruvot, Grand-Fort-Philippe, France	
2	Win	2–0	Taffo Asongwed	PTS	6	2010-04-10	Salle des Huttes, Gravelines, France	
1	Win	1–0	Engin Karakaplan	TKO	3 (6)	2010-02-27	Salle des Huttes, Gravelines, France	

== See also ==
- List of male boxers

Sporting positions
Regional boxing titles
Vacant Title last held by Herve Lofidi	WBC Francophone cruiserweight champion April 23, 2021 – 2021; Vacated	Vacant
World boxing titles
Vacant Title last held by Denis Lebedev	WBA cruiserweight champion Interim title June 21, 2014 – April 10, 2015; Lost bid for full title	Vacant Title next held by Beibut Shumenov
