= Ibuprofen/paracetamol =

Combination drug

Combination of
- Ibuprofen: Nonsteroidal anti-inflammatory drug
- Paracetamol: Analgesic/antipyretic

Clinical data
- Trade names: Combogesic, Advil Dual Action with Acetaminophen, Ibupane
- Other names: Acetaminophen/ibuprofen
- AHFS/Drugs.com: Micromedex Detailed Consumer Information
- License data: US DailyMed: Advil Dual Action
- Pregnancy category: AU: C
- Routes of administration: By mouth
- ATC code: M01AE51 (WHO)

Legal status
- Legal status: AU: S3 (Pharmacist only) / S2; CA: OTC; UK: General sales list (GSL, OTC) / P; US: OTC / Rx-only

Identifiers
- CAS Number: 462631-86-3
- KEGG: D11897

Ibuprofen/paracetamol, sold under the brand name Combogesic among others, is a fixed-dose combination of two medications, ibuprofen, a non-steroidal anti-inflammatory drug (NSAID); and paracetamol (acetaminophen), an analgesic and antipyretic. It is available as a generic medication.

== Medical uses ==
Ibuprofen/paracetamol is indicated for the short term management of mild to moderate acute pain.

There is evidence that paracetamol combined with ibuprofen provides pain relief better than either medication used alone.

== Society and culture ==
=== Brand names ===
The combination is available as Combiflam, Advil Dual Action with Acetaminophen, Ibupane, Morein Dual Action with Tylenol, and Combogesic.
