= Dmitry Kudryashov (boxer) =

Russian boxer

Dmitry Kudryashov Дмитрий Кудряшов
Personal information
- Nickname: The Russian Hammer
- Nationality: Russian
- Born: Dmitry Alexandrovich Kudryashov; 26 October 1985 (age 40) Volgodonsk, Rostov Oblast, Russian SFSR, then part of the Soviet Union
- Height: 1.89 m (6 ft 2 in)
- Weight: Cruiserweight; Bridgerweight

Boxing career
- Reach: 191 cm (75 in)

Boxing record
- Total fights: 32
- Wins: 26
- Win by KO: 25
- Losses: 6

Dmitry Alexandrovich Kudryashov (Russian: Дмитрий Александрович Кудряшов; born 26 October 1985) is a Russian professional boxer who has challenged once for the WBA (Regular) cruiserweight title in 2017.

== Early life ==
At the age of eight he began to practice karate, and at the age of thirteen engaged in the practice of boxing under the guidance of coach Nikolai Timofeev. In 2008 he was drafted into the army, he served in Rostov-on-Don. In January 2011, he won the VII Russian tournament "A" in the box "Spartak Cup", for which he was awarded the degree of master of sport. Kudriaszow finished amateur career, posting a record: 150 fights, 138 wins, 12 defeats.

== Professional career ==
=== Kudryashov vs. Okhrei ===
Featuring Kudryashov began his professional career on 30 July 2011, by defeating Ukrainian Oleksandr Okhrei via knockout in the third round.

=== Kudryashov vs. Mwekassa ===
On 30 November 2013, in lyubertsy Kudryashov defeated Zack Mwekassa by knockout at the beginning of the first round.

=== Kudryashov vs. Bacurin ===
May 23, 2014 won in Krasnodar, Russian by knockout in the seventh round of Croat Ivica Bacurin (17–5–1, 7 KOs).

=== Kudryashov vs. Ilie ===
October 18, 2014 in Rostov-on-Don defeated by technical knockout after the second round Romanian Giuliana Ilie (20–7–2, 6 KOs).

=== Kudryashov vs. Gomez ===
On 28 November 2014, in Moscow he knocked out Cuban Juan Carlos Gomez.

=== Kudryashov vs. Palacios ===
On 10 April 2015, at the Moscow gala he defeated Puerto Rican Francisco Palacios in the first round.

=== Kudryashov vs. Makabu ===
On 16 June 2019, Kudryashov fought Ilunga Makabu, who was ranked #4 by the WBC at cruiserweight. Makabu won by technical knockout in the 5th round.

=== Kudryashov vs. Tishchenko ===
On 11 September 2021, Evgeny Tishchenko beat Dmitry Kudryashov by unanimous decision in their 10-round contest. Tishchenko was ranked #14 by the IBF at cruiserweight at the time. The scorecards read 100–89, 100–89, 99–90 in favor of Tishchenko.

== Professional boxing record ==
32 fights	26 wins	6 losses
By knockout	25	3
By decision	1	3

No.	Result	Record	Opponent	Type	Round, time	Date	Location	Notes
32	Win	26–6	(United States) Sam Shewmaker	KO	1 (4), 1:34	27 Apr 2023	Manezh, Vladikavkaz, Russia	
31	Loss	25–6	(Russia) Soslan Asbarov	UD	8	24 Sep 2022	Moscow, Russia	
30	Win	25–5	(Russia) Vagab Vagabov	KO	1 (6), 0:45	11 Jun 2022	Irina Viner-Usmanova Gymnastics Palace, Moscow, Russia	
29	Loss	24–5	(Russia) Evgeny Tishchenko	UD	10	11 Sep 2021	RCC Boxing Academy, Yekaterinburg, Russia	For vacant WBC International cruiserweight title
28	Loss	24–4	(Russia) Evgenyi Romanov	UD	12	21 May 2021	Basketball Center, Khimki, Russia	For inaugural WBC Silver bridgerweight title
27	Win	24–3	(Czech Republic) Vaclav Pejsar	SD	10	21 Dec 2019	Ivan Yarygin Sports Palace, Krasnoyarsk, Russia	
26	Loss	23–3	(Democratic Republic of the Congo) Ilunga Makabu	TKO	5 (12), 2:36	16 Jun 2019	KRK Uralets, Yekaterinburg, Russia	For vacant WBC Silver cruiserweight title
25	Win	23–2	(Romania) Alexandru Jur	TKO	1 (10), 2:31	15 Sep 2018	GCS "Kuzbass", Kemerovo, Russia	
24	Win	22–2	(Uruguay) Mauricio Barragan	KO	6 (10), 2:10	5 Sep 2018	Amphitheatre, Grozny, Russia	
23	Loss	21–2	(Cuba) Yuniel Dorticos	KO	2 (12), 2:10	23 Sep 2017	(United States) Alamodome, San Antonio, Texas, US	For WBA (Regular) cruiserweight title; World Boxing Super Series: cruiserweight quarter-final
22	Win	21–1	(Nigeria) Olanrewaju Durodola	TKO	5 (12), 2:17	3 Jun 2017	Sports Palace, Rostov-on-Don, Russia	Retained WBC Silver cruiserweight title
21	Win	20–1	(Colombia) Santander Silgado	KO	1 (12), 1:44	3 Dec 2016	Khodynka Ice Palace, Moscow, Russia	Won vacant WBC Silver cruiserweight title
20	Win	19–1	(Brazil) Julio Cesar Dos Santos	TKO	4 (10), 1:48	21 May 2016	Khodynka Ice Palace, Moscow, Russia	
19	Loss	18–1	(Nigeria) Olanrewaju Durodola	TKO	2 (12), 2:29	4 Nov 2015	TatNeft Arena, Kazan, Russia	For vacant WBC Silver cruiserweight title
18	Win	18–0	(Namibia) Vikapita Meroro	KO	6 (10), 1:54	22 May 2015	Luzhniki Stadium, Moscow, Russia	
17	Win	17–0	(Puerto Rico) Francisco Palacios	KO	1 (10), 0:52	10 Apr 2015	Luzhniki Stadium, Moscow, Russia	Retained WBA International cruiserweight title
16	Win	16–0	(Cuba) Juan Carlos Gómez	KO	1 (10), 0:22	28 Nov 2014	Luzhniki Stadium, Moscow, Russia	Won WBA International cruiserweight title
15	Win	15–0	(Romania) Giulian Ilie	RTD	2 (10), 3:00	18 Oct 2014	Express CSC, Rostov-on-Don, Russia	
14	Win	14–0	(Croatia) Ivica Bacurin	KO	7 (12), 2:21	23 May 2014	Basket-Hall, Krasnodar, Russia	Retained WBC–CISBB cruiserweight title
13	Win	13–0	(Czech Republic) Lubos Suda	TKO	2 (12), 2:58	27 Mar 2014	Wonderland, Novorossiysk, Russia	Retained WBC–CISBB cruiserweight title
12	Win	12–0	(Democratic Republic of the Congo) Zack Mwekassa	KO	1 (10), 0:50	30 Nov 2013	Triumph, Lyubertsy, Russia	
11	Win	11–0	(Barbados) Shawn Cox	KO	2 (12), 1:24	26 Oct 2013	Express CSC, Rostov-on-Don, Russia	Won vacant GBU cruiserweight title
10	Win	10–0	(Russia) Ruslan Semenov	KO	5 (6), 0:20	28 Sep 2013	Bentley Centre, Barvikha, Russia	
9	Win	9–0	(Ghana) Prince George Akrong	TKO	5 (12), 2:13	25 May 2013	Olymp, Volgodonsk, Russia	Won vacant UBO cruiserweight title
8	Win	8–0	(Georgia (country)) Levan Jomardashvili	TKO	3 (12), 1:29	30 Mar 2013	Galich Hall, Krasnodar, Russia	Retained WBC–CISBB cruiserweight title
7	Win	7–0	(Ukraine) Semen Pakhomov	KO	1 (8), 2:00	16 Feb 2013	Trade and Entertainment Centre "Moskva", Kaspiysk, Russia	
6	Win	6–0	(Uzbekistan) Isroil Qurbonov	TKO	5 (12), 2:05	13 Oct 2012	Galich Hall, Krasnodar, Russia	Won vacant WBC–CISBB cruiserweight title
5	Win	5–0	(Ukraine) Oleksiy Varagushyn	TKO	1 (6), 2:38	1 May 2012	Dynamo Sports Palace, Moscow, Russia	
4	Win	4–0	(Kenya) Obadiah Mwangi	TKO	1 (8), 0:59	16 Mar 2012	Circus, Krasnodar, Russia	
3	Win	3–0	(Ukraine) Kostiantyn Okhrei	TKO	4 (6), 2:17	19 Nov 2011	Express CSC, Rostov-on-Don, Russia	
2	Win	2–0	(Ukraine) Vyacheslav Shcherbakov	RTD	1 (6), 3:00	26 Sep 2011	Olimp, Krasnodar, Russia	
1	Win	1–0	(Ukraine) Oleksandr Okhrei	KO	3 (4), 0:43	30 Jul 2011	Sport Centre, Kushchyovskaya, Russia	

Sporting positions
Regional boxing titles
Vacant Title last held by Alexander Kotlobay	WBC–CISBB cruiserweight champion 13 October 2012 – November 2014; Vacated	Vacant Title next held by Umid Rustamov
Vacant Title last held by Rodion Pastukh	UBO cruiserweight champion 25 May 2013 – October 2013; Vacated	Vacant Title next held by Joey Vegas
Vacant Title last held by Timur Stark	GBU cruiserweight champion 26 October 2013 – November 2013; Vacated	Vacant Title next held by Agron Dzila
Preceded by Juan Carlos Gómez	WBA International cruiserweight champion 28 November 2014 – November 2015; Vacated	Vacant Title next held by Maksim Vlasov
Vacant Title last held by Mairis Briedis	WBC Silver cruiserweight champion 3 December 2016 – September 2017; Vacated	Vacant Title next held by Maxim Vlasov
