= 2017–18 World Boxing Super Series – cruiserweight division =

Boxing competition

The 2017–18 World Boxing Super Series – cruiserweight division was a World Boxing Super Series professional boxing tournament that took place between September 2017 and July 2018 in several countries. The Super Series featured eight top-rated cruiserweight boxers in a single-elimination tournament. Its winner will hold world titles for all four of boxing's major sanctioning bodies, The Ring Magazine title, as well as the Muhammad Ali trophy. The tournament was organized by Comosa AG. A super middleweight tournament was held concurrently, with prize money for both competitions totalling US$50 million.

At the start of the cruiserweight portion of the tournament, the world championship titles recognized by the four different sanctioning bodies – WBA (established 1921), WBC (est. 1963), IBF (est. 1983) and WBO (est. 1988) – were held by four different boxers. All four of these boxers participated in the tournament, resulting in the eventual tournament champion, Oleksandr Usyk, becoming only the fourth boxer in history to become the undisputed champion of a weight class by holding the world titles from all four these sanctioning bodies.

== Participants ==
Rating^{1}	Boxer	Record^{2}	Stance	Height	Age^{2}	World titles^{2}
6	Mairis Briedis (LAT)	22–0–0	Orthodox	1.86 m (6 ft 1 in)	January 13, 1985 (aged 32)	WBC World Champion
9	Yuniel Dorticos (CUB)	21–0–0	Orthodox	1.91 m (6 ft 3 in)	March 11, 1986 (aged 31)	WBA World Champion
2	Murat Gassiev (RUS)	24–0–0	Orthodox	1.92 m (6 ft 3 1/2 in)	October 12, 1993 (aged 23)	IBF World Champion
10	Marco Huck (GER)	40–4–1	Orthodox	1.88 m (6 ft 2 in)	November 11, 1984 (aged 32)	
—N/a	Dmitry Kudryashov (RUS)	21–1–0	Orthodox	1.89 m (6 ft 2 1/2 in)	October 26, 1985 (aged 31)	
—N/a	Mike Perez (CUB)	22–2–1	Southpaw	1.85 m (6 ft 1 in)	October 20, 1985 (aged 31)	
1	Oleksandr Usyk (UKR)	12–0–0	Southpaw	1.90 m (6 ft 3 in)	January 17, 1987 (aged 30)	WBO World Champion
7	Krzysztof Włodarczyk (POL)	53–3–1	Orthodox	1.86 m (6 ft 1 in)	September 19, 1981 (aged 35)	

^1 Transnational Boxing Rankings Board rankings on 8 August 2017, the last archived rankings before the start of the tournament.
^2 Age, records, and titles listed as of the start of the tournament.

- Krzysztof Głowacki and Mateusz Masternak are tournament reserves.

== Bracket ==
The format of the tournament required four seeded fighters to each choose their opponent from the four remaining unseeded fighters in a draft. The seeded fighters were determined by the organizers. The draft took place on July 8, 2017, in a gala hosted by actress Melanie Winiger in Monte Carlo. Per IBF rules, Gassiev had to defend his title against Włodarczyk before facing anyone else. Therefore, that matchup was pre-arranged before the draft.

Quarter-finals
Oleksandr Usyk (UKR)	TKO 10
Marco Huck (GER)
Mairis Briedis (LAT)	UD 12
Mike Perez (CUB)
Murat Gassiev (RUS)	KO 3
Krzysztof Włodarczyk (POL)
Yuniel Dorticos (CUB)	KO 2
Dmitry Kudryashov (RUS)

Semi-finals
Oleksandr Usyk (UKR)	MD 12
Mairis Briedis (LAT)
Murat Gassiev (RUS)	TKO 12
Yuniel Dorticos (CUB)

Final
Oleksandr Usyk (UKR)	UD 12
Murat Gassiev (RUS)

== Quarterfinals ==
=== Usyk vs. Huck ===
- Date: 9 September 2017
- Venue: Max-Schmeling-Halle, Berlin, Germany
- Title(s) on the line: Usyk's WBO cruiserweight title

Tale of the tape
Boxer	(Ukraine) Oleksandr Usyk	(Germany) Marco Huck
Nickname	The Cat	Captain
Hometown	Simferopol, Ukraine	Berlin, Germany
Height	6 ft 3 in (1.91 m)	6 ft 2 in (1.88 m)
Weight	199 1/2 lb (90.5 kg)	198 4/5 lb (90.2 kg)

Result
- Usyk defeats Huck in the 10th round via TKO.

In the inaugural match of the Super Series, top-seeded Oleksandr Usyk sought to defend his title against Marco Huck. At the weigh-in, Usyk hitting the scales at precisely 199 1/2 lbs, while Huck weighed-in at 198 3/4 lbs. The fight took place at Max-Schmeling-Halle and was announced by Jimmy Lennon Jr. At the final press conference, a bit of controversy occurred during the head to head photo, where Huck pushed his opponent Usyk.

The first Super Series quarter-final saw Usyk successfully retain his WBO title and advance to the semi-finals after the referee stepped in to stop the encounter and save Huck from further punishment. The official time of the stoppage was 2:16 in round 10. Usyk had little trouble in the fight. Huck provided heart and toughness, showing he was certainly not a pushover but Usyk's boxing skills were too much, completely outboxing Huck and continuously landing punches. The win was Usyk's third successful title defense, and sees him advance to the next stage of the Super Series.

The undercard was headlined by a bout between Noel Gevor and Isiah Thomas. Both fighters were coming off losses, but Gevor got the win via unanimous decision, with all three judges scoring the fight 100–89 in favor of Gevor.

=== Dorticos vs. Kudryashov ===
- Date: 23 September 2017
- Venue: Alamodome, San Antonio, United States
- Title(s) on the line: Dorticos' WBA (Regular) cruiserweight title

Tale of the tape
Boxer	(Cuba) Yuniel Dorticos	(Russia) Dmitry Kudryashov
Nickname	The KO Doctor	The Russian Hammer
Hometown	Havana, Cuba	Volgodonsk, Russia
Height	6 ft 3 in (1.91 m)	6 ft 2 1/2 in (1.89 m)
Weight	199 lb (90 kg)	200 lb (91 kg)

Result
- Dorticos defeats Kudryashov in the 2nd round via KO.

The second Super Series cruiserweight quarterfinal featured Yuniel Dorticos defending his WBA (Regular) title against Dmitry Kudryashov. The bout generated some expectation, as Kudryashov and Dorticos were both known as knockout punchers, with 42 out of 43 of their combined previous fights ending by way of knockout. This will be the Super Series' first match in the United States. A percentage of the gate revenue will be donated to the San Antonio Food Bank to aid victims of Hurricane Harvey. At the official weigh-in, Dmitry Kudryashov initially missed weight by half a pound, coming in at 200 1/2 lbs. However, he was able to come in at exactly 200 lbs in a second try 45 minutes later. Dorticos weighed in at 199 lbs.

On fight night, Dorticos retained his title and advanced to the semi-finals by knocking out Kudryashov in just 2 rounds. The fight started with a slow-paced, feel out round, with both boxers studying their opponent. Dorticos successfully executed a pull counter as the bell sounded. In round 2, the pace of the fight increased, with Dorticos and Kudryashov trading combinations. Eventually, Dorticos gained the upper hand by landing a series of one-two combos, as Kudryashov retreated behind his high guard. Dorticos ended the contest by knocking out Kudryashov with a right hook. The referee waived the count with a minute left in round 2.

In the undercard, Keith Tapia won a wide unanimous decision over Lateef Kayode (100–89, 100–89, 99–90), having dropped him once at the end of round 6. Earlier, four-weight world champion Nonito Donaire defeated Rubén García Hernández by unanimous decision (100–90, 99–91, 97–93) for the WBC Silver featherweight title.

=== Briedis vs. Perez ===
- Date: 30 September 2017
- Venue: Arena Riga, Riga, Latvia
- Title(s) on the line: Briedis' WBC cruiserweight title

Tale of the tape
Boxer	(Latvia) Mairis Briedis	(Cuba) Mike Perez
Nickname		The Rebel
Hometown	Riga, Latvia	Ciego de Ávila, Cuba
Height	6 ft 1 in (1.85 m)	6 ft 1 in (1.85 m)
Weight	198 1/2 lb (90.0 kg)	197 1/3 lb (89.5 kg)

Result
- Briedis defeats Perez via UD (116–110, 114–112, 115–111)

Mairis Briedis defended his WBC cruiserweight title against Mike Perez in the third WBSS cruiserweight quarterfinal. This was Perez's second fight as a cruiserweight, after he came down from the heavyweight division following a TKO loss to Alexander Povetkin. The bout took place in Briedis' hometown of Riga, at the eponymous Arena Riga. At the official weigh-in, Briedis tipped the scales at 198 1/2 lbs, while Mike Perez came in lighter, at 197 1/3 lbs.

Briedis won a scrappy fight in his hometown, beating Mike Perez by unanimous decision after 12 rounds (116–110, 114–112, 115–111). Perez was deducted a point in round 3 following an accidental headbutt. Briedis was also docked a point during round 10 for excessive holding. With the win, Briedis moves on to the semifinals to face top-seeded Oleksandr Usyk.

The undercard saw tournament reserve Krzysztof Głowacki beat Leonardo Bruzesse via 5th-round knockout and super heavyweight Olympic medalist Filip Hrgović dominate and defeat Zumbano Love via TKO in the first round in his professional debut.

=== Gassiev vs. Włodarczyk ===
- Date: 21 October 2017
- Venue: Prudential Center, Newark, U.S.
- Title(s) on the line: Gassiev's IBF cruiserweight title

Tale of the tape
Boxer	(Russia) Murat Gassiev	(Poland) Krzysztof Włodarczyk
Nickname	Iron	Diablo
Hometown	Vladikavkaz, Russia	Warsaw, Poland
Height	6 ft 4 in (1.93 m)	6 ft 1 in (1.85 m)
Weight	199 lb (90 kg)	199 1/2 lb (90.5 kg)

Result
- Gassiev defeats Włodarczyk in the 3rd round via KO

The final cruiserweight quarterfinal match was between IBF champion Murat Gassiev and former IBF and WBC champion Krzysztof Włodarczyk. the fight would take place in Newark, New Jersey at the Prudential Center on 21 October 2017. One of the main factors for the fight taking place in New Jersey was due to the Polish population in that state. At the official weigh-in, Gassiev tipped the scales at 199 lb, while Włodarczyk weighed 199 1/2 lb.

Gassiev delivered a dominant 3rd-round KO, retaining his IBF title and securing his place in the semi-finals. Gassiev was in control the opening two rounds working away on Włodarczyk. Midway through round 3, having Włodarczyk against the ropes, Gassiev connected with a left uppercut to the head, which was immediately followed by a left to the body, dropping Włodarczyk on all fours, flat on the canvas. Włodarczyk, clearly in pain, failed to beat the 10 count. The official time of stoppage was 1:57 of the round. Gassiev, who was pleased with his performance, said, "I had a great opponent tonight. I prepared myself for a tough fight, but it is boxing, and anything can happen. We do a lot of work in the gym, and I just listened to my coach round after round, and he told me what I needed to do. That's all I needed." Włodarczyk accepted defeat admitting the better man won.

On the undercard, Maciej Sulęcki defeated Jack Culcay via unanimous decision, and tournament alternate Mateusz Masternak beat Stivens Bujaj.

== Semifinals ==
All four pre-tournament champions emerged from the quarterfinals, retaining their respective cruiserweight world champion titles: Usyk as champion of the WBO; Briedis as champion of the WBC; Gassiev as champion of the IBF; and Dorticos as champion of the WBA. This meant that each semifinal bout would result in a champion unifying two sanctioning bodies' titles.

=== Usyk vs. Briedis ===
- Date: 27 January 2018
- Venue: Arēna Rīga, Riga, Latvia
- Title(s) on the line: Usyk's WBO and Briedis' WBC cruiserweight titles

Tale of the tape
Boxer	(Ukraine) Oleksandr Usyk	(Latvia) Mairis Briedis
Nickname	The Cat	The Latvian Punisher
Hometown	Simferopol, Ukraine	Riga, Latvia
Height	6 ft 3 in (1.91 m)	6 ft 1 in (1.85 m)
Weight	199.3 lb (90.4 kg)	199.1 lb (90.3 kg)

Result
- Usyk defeats Briedis via MD (115–113, 114–114, 115–113), becomes unified WBC–WBO champion

On 27 January 2018, Usyk defeated Briedis by a majority decision, becoming the unified WBC–WBO champion.

=== Gassiev vs. Dorticos ===
- Date: 3 February 2018
- Venue: Bolshoy Ice Dome, Sochi, Russia
- Title(s) on the line: Gassiev's IBF and Dorticos' WBA cruiserweight titles

Tale of the tape
Boxer	(Russia) Murat Gassiev	(Cuba) Yuniel Dorticos
Nickname	Iron	The KO Doctor
Hometown	Vladikavkaz, Russia	Havana, Cuba
Height	6 ft 4 in (1.93 m)	6 ft 3 in (1.91 m)
Weight	199 lb (90 kg)	200 lb (91 kg)

Result
- Gassiev defeats Dorticos in the 12th round via TKO, becomes unified IBF–WBA champion

On 3 February 2018, Gassiev defeated Dorticos by a technical knockout in the 12th round, becoming the unified WBA–IBF champion.

== Final ==
- Date: 21 July 2018
- Venue: Olympic Stadium, Moscow, Russia
- Title(s) on the line: Gassiev's IBF and WBA, and Usyk's WBC and WBO cruiserweight titles

Tale of the tape
Boxer	(Ukraine) Oleksandr Usyk	(Russia) Murat Gassiev
Nickname	The Cat	Iron
Hometown	Simferopol, Ukraine	Vladikavkaz, Russia
Height	6 ft 3 in (1.91 m)	6 ft 3 in (1.91 m)
Weight	198 1/4 lb (89.9 kg)	198 1/4 lb (89.9 kg)

Result
- Usyk defeats Gassiev via UD (120–108, 119–109, 119–109), becomes four title undisputed champion

Initially, the final was scheduled for 11 May 2018 in Jeddah, Saudi Arabia, but later it was rescheduled for 21 July 2018 in Moscow, Russia.

Usyk defeated Gassiev by a unanimous decision, unifying the cruiserweight titles of all four major sanctioning organizations, becoming the undisputed cruiserweight world champion.

== See also ==
- 2017–18 World Boxing Super Series – super middleweight division
