= Isiah Thomas (boxer) =

American boxer (born 1989)

Personal information
- Born: Alex Isiah Thomas; January 30, 1989 (age 37) Detroit, Michigan, U.S.
- Height: 6 ft 4 in (193 cm)
- Weight: Cruiserweight

Boxing career
- Reach: 80 in (203 cm)
- Stance: Southpaw

Boxing record
- Total fights: 18
- Wins: 15
- Win by KO: 6
- Losses: 2
- No contests: 1

Isiah Thomas (born January 30, 1989) is an American professional boxer. As an amateur, he won a gold medal at the first-ever Junior World Boxing Championship for the United States at the 2005 Cadet World Championships.

== Amateur career ==
A natural southpaw, Thomas had his first bout in 2002 and continued his winning ways en route to becoming a two-time Junior Olympic National Champion as well as easily winning the World Championships, garnering praise from Emanuel Steward: "I have a kid who will be the next big thing—Isiah Thomas. I don't have to teach him much, he's a gifted athlete. I haven't seen anyone as good since Mays."

His amateur career, however, stalled somewhat as his two losses against compatriots in 2006 and his loss to Deontay Wilder at the 2007 National Golden Gloves attested.

== Professional career ==
He turned professional at light heavyweight in 2008.

In December 2015, Thomas fought Murat Gassiev in a fight that was ruled a no contest after Thomas was hit after the bell in the third round.
