= Matthew Godfrey =

Matthew Godfrey may refer to:

- Matt Godfrey (born 1981), American boxer
- Matt Godfrey (angler) (born 1991), English angler
