= Mirko Larghetti =

Italian boxer

Personal information
- Nationality: Italian
- Born: 19 September 1982 (age 43) Frontino, Pesaro and Urbino, Marche, Italy
- Height: 1.84 m (6 ft 0 in)
- Weight: Cruiserweight

Boxing career
- Stance: Orthodox

Boxing record
- Total fights: 26
- Wins: 24
- Win by KO: 16
- Losses: 2

Mirko Larghetti (born 19 September 1982) is an Italian professional boxer. He held the European Union cruiserweight title from 2013 to 2014, and has challenged once for the WBO cruiserweight title in 2014.

== Professional career ==
Larghetti made his professional debut on 15 March 2009, scoring a fifth-round disqualification win over Boris Uhlik. In his fifteenth fight, on 18 November 2011, Larghetti won his first regional championship—the vacant WBC Silver International cruiserweight title—by stopping Laszlo Hubert in six rounds. This was improved upon two years later, on 15 June 2013, when Larghetti stopped Vincenzo Rossitto in eight rounds to become the European Union cruiserweight champion. Larghetti made one successful defence of the title on 22 November 2013, winning a unanimous decision over Stjepan Vugdelija.

In 2014, having fought exclusively in Italy, Larghetti received an opportunity to fight for his first world title, against long-reigning WBO cruiserweight champion Marco Huck in Germany. The fight was originally scheduled for 29 March, but was moved to 30 August after Huck sustained a thumb injury during training. Huck went on to win a wide unanimous decision, handing Larghetti his first professional loss, but the conclusion of the fight was criticised when Huck appeared to score a last-second knockout in the final round; this was overturned by the referee, who ruled that Larghetti's knockdown had occurred after the bell had sounded.

== Professional boxing record ==
26 fights	24 wins	2 losses
By knockout	16	0
By decision	8	2

No.	Result	Record	Opponent	Type	Round, time	Date	Location	Notes
26	Loss	24–2	Micki Nielsen	UD	12	19 Mar 2016	Musikteatret, Albertslund, Denmark	For WBC International cruiserweight title
25	Win	24–1	Marko Martinjak	RTD	4 (6), 3:00	1 Aug 2015	Stadio Comunale Cetorelli, Fiumicino, Italy	
24	Win	23–1	Gyorgy Novak	TKO	2 (6)	5 Jun 2015	Bikini Disco Dinner, Cattolica, Italy	
23	Win	22–1	Peter Hegyes	TKO	3 (6)	20 Dec 2014	Palazzetto dello Sport, Fabrica di Roma, Italy	
22	Loss	21–1	Marco Huck	UD	12	30 Aug 2014	Gerry Weber Stadion, Halle, Germany	For WBO cruiserweight title
21	Win	21–0	Attila Palko	KO	2 (6)	7 Jun 2014	Palazzetto dello Sport, Tolfa, Italy	
20	Win	20–0	Stjepan Vugdelija	UD	12	22 Nov 2013	Palazzetto dello Sport, Frontino, Italy	Retained European Union cruiserweight title
19	Win	19–0	Vincenzo Rossitto	TKO	8 (12)	15 Jun 2013	Campo Sportivo Comunale, Bertinoro, Italy	Won vacant European Union cruiserweight title
18	Win	18–0	Arturs Kulikauskis	TKO	4 (6)	15 Dec 2012	PalaGarda, Riva del Garda, Italy	
17	Win	17–0	Toni Visic	KO	3 (6)	27 Oct 2012	Palazzetto dello Sport Arcella, Padua, Italy	
16	Win	16–0	Istvan Varga	TKO	1 (6), 1:53	17 Mar 2012	PalaRavizza, Pavia, Italy	
15	Win	15–0	Laszlo Hubert	TKO	6 (12)	18 Nov 2011	Bocciodromo Comunale, Sant'Angelo in Vado, Italy	Won vacant WBC Silver International cruiserweight title
14	Win	14–0	Jevgenijs Andrejevs	UD	6	29 Jul 2011	Loiano, Italy	
13	Win	13–0	Arturs Kulikauskis	UD	6	8 Jul 2011	Piazza XX settembre, Civitanova Marche, Italy	
12	Win	12–0	Igoris Borucha	UD	6	2 Apr 2011	Palapalestre, Ferrara, Italy	
11	Win	11–0	Remigijus Ziausys	UD	6	19 Feb 2011	Bocciodromo Comunale, Sant'Angelo in Vado, Italy	
10	Win	10–0	Jevgenijs Andrejevs	TKO	6 (6)	27 Nov 2010	Palazzetto dello Sport, Civitavecchia, Italy	
9	Win	9–0	Krisztian Jaksi	TKO	4 (6)	30 Jul 2010	Pomezia, Italy	
8	Win	8–0	Boris Uhlik	KO	2 (6), 1:42	26 Jun 2010	Piazza Mazzini, San Clemente, Italy	
7	Win	7–0	Sandor Balogh	PTS	6	23 Apr 2010	Palazzetto dello Sport, Malnate, Italy	
6	Win	6–0	Sandor Polgar	TKO	3 (6), 2:50	13 Mar 2010	Palazzetto dello sport, Morciano di Romagna, Italy	
5	Win	5–0	Michal Tomko	KO	3 (6)	26 Dec 2009	Sassocorvaro, Italy	
4	Win	4–0	Massimiliano Pinna	TKO	5 (6)	25 Sep 2009	Palazzetto dello Sport, Porto Torres, Italy	
3	Win	3–0	Viktor Szalai	TKO	2 (6)	25 Jul 2009	Piazza Roma, Rimini, Italy	
2	Win	2–0	Sandor Balogh	PTS	4	16 May 2009	GranTeatro, Rome, Italy	
1	Win	1–0	Boris Uhlik	DQ	5 (6)	15 Mar 2009	Morciano di Romagna, Italy	Professional debut

Sporting positions
Regional boxing titles
New title	WBC Silver International cruiserweight champion 11 November 2011 – June 2012; Vacated	Vacant Title next held by Dmytro Kucher
Vacant Title last held by Juho Haapoja	European Union cruiserweight champion 15 June 2013 – August 2014; Vacated	Vacant Title next held by Stjepan Vugdelija
