= Michael Simms (boxer) =

American boxer

Personal information
- Full name: Michael Simms Jr.
- Nationality: United States
- Born: July 26, 1974 (age 52) Sacramento, California

Sport
- Sport: Boxing
- Weight class: Light heavyweight
Medal record
World Championships
Gold medal – first place	1999 Houston	Light Heavyweight

Michael Simms Jr (born July 26, 1974) is an American former professional boxer who competed from 2000 to 2012. As an amateur, he won a gold medal at the 1999 World Championships at light heavyweight.

== Amateur career ==
Simms won the tournament in Houston 1999 by beating David Haye 8–2, Humberto Savigne of Cuba 5–1, defeating Ali Ismayilov of Azerbaijan by 7–5 and getting a controversial 3–3 (countback 33–26) decision over John Dovi of France in the final.

A year later, Simms was dropped from the Olympics 2000 team for breaches of discipline, and replaced with.

== Professional career ==
He turned pro in 2000 but disappointed displaying a world class chin but moderate power and questionable work ethic. He drew with undefeated Felix Cora Jr. in 2003, then lost to undefeated heavyweight Nurlan Meirmanov, the rematch with Cora in 2004, undefeated cruiser Vadim Tokarev, Ola Afolabi (9–1) and undefeated Marco Huck in 2005. In 2007 he lost to Louis Azille and undefeated heavyweight Roman Greenberg.

== Professional boxing record ==
22 Wins (14 knockouts, 8 decisions), 16 Losses (2 knockouts, 14 decisions), 2 Draws
Result	Record	Opponent	Type	Round	Date	Location	Notes
Loss	24-0	(Poland) Mateusz Masternak	TKO	4	04/02/2012	(Germany) Fraport Arena, Frankfurt	Referee stopped the bout at 1:16 of the fourth round.
Win	8-16-1	(United States) Leo Bercier	TKO	5	05/11/2011	(United States) Thunder Valley Casino Resort, Lincoln, California	
Loss	10-0	(Russia) Rakhim Chakhkiyev	KO	4	24/09/2011	(Germany) Dima-Sportcenter, Hamburg	Simms knocked out at 1:43 of the fourth round.
Loss	11-2	(Ukraine) Anatoliy Dudchenko	UD	6	03/06/2011	(United States) Warner Center Marriott, Woodland Hills, California	
Loss	21-0	(Germany) Alexander Frenkel	UD	8	13/03/2010	(Germany) Max-Schmeling-Halle, Berlin	
Win	12-1-1	(Germany) Martin Kempf	UD	8	05/12/2009	(Germany) Arena Ludwigsburg, Ludwigsburg	
Loss	19-1	(United States) Matt Godfrey	SD	10	12/09/2009	(United States) Red Lion Hotel, Sacramento, California	
Draw	24-10-2	(United States) Kelvin Davis	PTS	6	07/08/2009	(United States) Red Lion Hotel, Sacramento, California	
Loss	21-1	(Canada) Troy Ross	UD	10	19/06/2009	(Canada) Bell Centre, Montreal, Quebec	
Loss	16-1	(Cuba) Yoan Pablo Hernandez	MD	8	25/10/2008	(Germany) Weser-Ems-Halle, Oldenburg	
Win	25-6	(United States) Derrick Harmon	UD	6	15/05/2008	(United States) Red Lion Hotel, Sacramento, California	
Loss	28-1	(Russia) Grigory Drozd	UD	8	23/02/2008	(Russia) DIVS, Ekaterinburg	
Loss	10-5	(Cuba) Damian Norris	SD	10	07/02/2008	(United States) Red Lion Hotel, Sacramento, California	
Loss	24-0	(Israel) Roman Greenberg	UD	10	10/03/2007	(United States) Madison Square Garden, New York City	
Loss	18-3-2	(Dominica) Louis Azille	UD	8	22/02/2007	(United States) Radisson Hotel, Sacramento, California	
Loss	11-0	(Germany) Marco Huck	UD	8	17/12/2005	(Germany) Max-Schmeling-Halle, Berlin	
Win	19-22-3	(United States) Willie Chapman	UD	6	30/09/2005	(United States) Cache Creek Casino Resort, Brooks, California	
Win	23-23-5	(United States) David Vedder	UD	8	26/08/2005	(United States) Radisson Hotel, Sacramento, California	
Loss	9-1-3	(United Kingdom) Ola Afolabi	UD	8	19/08/2005	(United States) Gold Coast Hotel and Casino, Las Vegas, Nevada	
Win	12-6-1	(United States) Troy Beets	UD	10	21/07/2005	(United States) ARCO Arena, Sacramento, California	
Loss	18-0-1	(Russia) Vadim Tokarev	UD	10	13/05/2005	(Russia) Kazan Sports Hall, Kazan	
Win	10-7-3	(United States) Jonathan Young	UD	8	29/04/2005	(United States) Radisson Hotel, Sacramento, California	
Win	27-8-2	(Uganda) Joseph Kiwanuka	RTD	8	10/12/2004	(United States) ARCO Arena, Sacramento, California	Kiwanuka retired after the eighth round.
Win	8-8-2	(Mexico) Victor Maciel	KO	1	14/10/2004	(United States) ARCO Arena, Sacramento, California	Maciel knocked out at 0:55 of the first round.
Loss	13-0-2	(United States) Felix Cora, Jr.	MD	12	25/06/2004	(United States) Ramada Inn, Rosemont, Illinois	IBF USBA Cruiserweight Title.
Win	5-1	(Brazil) Marcelino Novaes	TKO	6	27/03/2004	(United States) ARCO Arena, Stateline, Nevada	Referee stopped the bout at 1:47 of the sixth round.
Loss	7-0	(Cuba) Yanqui Diaz	MD	6	21/02/2004	(United States) City Center Pavilion, Reno, Nevada	
Draw	10-0	(United States) Felix Cora, Jr.	PTS	10	15/03/2003	(United States) UIC Pavilion, Chicago, Illinois	
Win	13-32-8	(United States) Wesley Martin	KO	2	01/11/2002	(United States) ARCO Arena, Sacramento, California	Martin knocked out at 1:45 of the second round.
Win	6-22-1	(Cuba) Miguel Aquila	RTD	4	24/05/2002	(United States) Feather Falls Casino, Oroville, California	
Win	9-20	(United States) Tracy Barrios	TKO	4	29/03/2002	(United States) Radisson Hotel, Sacramento, California	Referee stopped the bout at 0:36 of the fourth round.
Win	14-23	(Cuba) Ali Sanchez	TKO	3	19/12/2001	(United States) Feather Falls Casino, Oroville, California	Referee stopped the bout at 2:58 of the third round.
Win	11-4	(United States) Reggie Roberts	UD	10	07/09/2001	(United States) Radisson Hotel, Sacramento, California	
Win	--	(United States) Richard Curtis	TKO	1	21/07/2001	(United States) Feather Falls Casino, Oroville, California	Referee stopped the bout at 1:50 of the first round.
Win	--	(United States) Maximo Martinez	KO	2	22/06/2001	(United States) Vallejo, California	
Win	3-4	(United States) Kevin Gilchrist	TKO	1	27/04/2001	(United States) Caesars Tahoe, Stateline, Nevada	
Win	3-3	(United States) Kevin Gilchrist	KO	2	11/03/2001	(United States) Feather Falls Casino, Oroville, California	Gilchrist knocked out at 1:42 of the second round.
Win	4-4-2	(United States) Marcus Harvey	KO	2	19/01/2001	(United States) ARCO Arena, Sacramento, California	Harvey knocked out at 1:08 of the second round.
Win	5-3-1	(Mexico) Jose Carlos Gonzalez	KO	2	27/10/2000	(United States) Feather Falls Casino, Oroville, California	
Win	24-23-2	(Mexico) Jesus Mayorga	MD	4	19/08/2000	(United States) Feather Falls Casino, Oroville, California	

Awards and achievements
Preceded by Olanda Anderson	United States Amateur Light Heavyweight Champion; 1999	Succeeded by Olanda Anderson
