= Shaun George =

Shaun or Sean George may refer to:

- Shaun George (boxer) (born 1979), American boxer
- Shaun George (cricketer) (born 1968), South African umpire and former cricketer
- Diabolic (rapper), né Sean George
