= Felix Cora Jr. =

American boxer

Personal information
- Born: 18 February 1980 (age 46) Galveston, Texas, U.S.
- Height: 6 ft 0 in (183 cm)
- Weight: Cruiserweight

Boxing career
- Reach: 75 in (191 cm)
- Stance: Southpaw

Boxing record
- Total fights: 34
- Wins: 25
- Win by KO: 14
- Losses: 7
- Draws: 2

Felix Cora Jr. (born 18 February 1980) is an American professional boxer. He is a former holder of the USBA and NABF cruiserweight titles and was a contestant in the fourth season of the reality TV show The Contender.

== Professional career ==
=== Early boxing career ===
Cora made his professional boxing debut in September 2000 with a 2nd round stoppage win over Mitchell Seigrist in Houston, Texas. Over the next three years he boxed a further 14 times, winning 12 with two draws including one draw with the then unbeaten Michael Simms. By January 2004, Cora could boast an unbeaten professional record of 13-0-2.

=== Title fights ===
In June 2004, Cora once again challenged old foe Michael Simms, this time for the vacant USBA cruiserweight title in Rosemont, Illinois. Cora won the bout via a majority decision to claim the title and to go one better than the last time he faced Simms. Throughout the rest of 2004, Cora defended his belt twice more scoring wins over Jermell Barnes (UD12) and James Elizalde (TKO 6).

In October 2005, Cora challenged for, and won, the NABF version of the cruiserweight title beating champion Arthur Williams after Williams corner retired him in the 8th round. He would defend the belt only once against Darnell Wilson in March 2006 before losing it in his first career defeat to Russian Vadim Tokarev in May of the same year.

Cora suffered his second career defeat to unbeaten former Olympian team-mate Matt Godfrey in his very next fight. The fight which took place in April 2007 in Connecticut was also for Cora's former NABF belt which had been vacated by Tokarev. Godfrey won the fight via a 2nd round TKO.

=== The Contender Series ===
In 2008 Cora joined the cast of the 4th series of the boxing reality show, The Contender and became a member of the blue team. On 3 December 2008 he boxed his first round contest against the gold team's Joell Godfrey and won a unanimous decision over 5 rounds. He was knocked out of the competition at the quarter-final stage after meeting Canadian Troy Ross who stopped him in the 1st round. In the season finale he knocked out Tim Flamos in the 3rd round

=== Comeback ===
After a 15 month layoff Cora Jr. returned to the ring on 4 June 2010 to face Billy Willis in a fight made at heavyweight winning in the sixth round. He fought twice more in 2010 beating Rubin Williams on 19 August and traveling to Manchester in England on 13 November to lose an eliminator contest for the IBF cruiserweight title to Enad Licina. In his first fight of 2011 on 5 March Cora Jr fought abroad once more traveling to Poland to fight Pawel Kolodziej for the WBA International cruiserweight title only to lose on points over 12 rounds.

== Professional boxing record ==
23 Wins (12 knockouts, 11 decisions), 6 Losses (3 knockouts, 3 decisions), 2 Draws
Result	Record	Opponent	Type	Round	Date	Location	Notes
Loss	25-7-2	(Russia) Murat Gassiev	TKO	9	17/04/2015	(United States) Foxwoods Resort, Mashantucket, Connecticut	For IBF Inter-Continental cruiserweight title
Win	25-6-2	(United States) Andrae Carthron	KO	2 (8)	28/03/2014	(United States) San Luis Convention Center, Galveston, Texas	
Win	24-6-2	(Brazil) Laudelino Barros	KO	11 (12)	26/10/2013	(Brazil) Ginásio Esportivo Profesor José Liberatti, Osasco, São Paulo	Win WBO Latino Cruiserweight title
Win	23-6-2	(United States) Andrew Greeley	UD	6	25/08/2012	(United States) Charles T. Doyle Convention Center, Texas City, Texas	
Loss	22-6-2	(Nigeria) Lateef Kayode	UD	10	09/09/2011	(United States) Grand Casino, Hinckley, Minnesota	WBA NABA Cruiserweight Title.
Loss	22-5-2	(Poland) Paweł Kołodziej	UD	12	05/03/2011	(Poland) Krynica-Zdrój	WBA International Cruiserweight Title.
Loss	22-4-2	(Serbia) Enad Ličina	UD	12	13/11/2010	(United Kingdom) MEN Arena, Manchester	
Win	22-3-2	(United States) Rubin Williams	RTD	5	19/08/2010	(United States) Charles T. Doyle Convention Center, Texas City, Texas	Williams did not come out for round five.
Win	21-3-2	(United States) Billy Willis	RTD	6	04/06/2010	(United States) Charles T. Doyle Convention Center, Texas City, Texas	Willis did not come out for round six.
Win	20-3-2	(United States) Tim Flamos	TKO	3	25/02/2009	(United States) Foxwoods, Mashantucket, Connecticut	Referee stopped the bout at 1:57 of the third round.
Loss	19-3-2	(Canada) Troy Ross	TKO	1	28/01/2009	Singapore	Referee stopped the bout at 2:38 of the first round.
Win	19-2-2	(United States) Joell Godfrey	UD	5	03/12/2008	Singapore	
Loss	18-2-2	(United States) Matt Godfrey	TKO	2	06/04/2007	(United States) Mohegan Sun, Uncasville, Connecticut	WBC NABF/WBA NABA Cruiserweight Titles. Referee stopped the bout at 2:45 of the second round.
Loss	18-1-2	(Russia) Vadim Tokarev	TKO	4	18/05/2006	(United States) Seminole Hard Rock Hotel and Casino Hollywood, Hollywood, Florida	WBC NABF Cruiserweight Title. Referee stopped the bout at 2:52 of the fourth round.
Win	18-0-2	(United States) Darnell Wilson	UD	10	24/03/2006	(United States) Seminole Hard Rock Hotel and Casino Hollywood, Hollywood, Florida	WBC NABF Cruiserweight Title.
Win	17-0-2	(United States) Arthur Williams	TKO	8	27/10/2005	(United States) Coeur d'Alene Casino, Worley, Idaho	WBC NABF Cruiserweight Title. Referee stopped the bout at the end of the eighth round.
Win	16-0-2	(United States) James Elizalde	TKO	6	02/12/2004	(United States) Northern Quest Resort & Casino, Airway Heights, Washington	IBF USBA Cruiserweight Title. Referee stopped the bout at the end of the sixth round.
Win	15-0-2	(United States) Jermell Barnes	UD	12	07/08/2004	(United States) Foxwoods, Mashantucket, Connecticut	IBF USBA Cruiserweight Title.
Win	14-0-2	(United States) Michael Simms	MD	12	25/06/2004	(United States) Ramada Inn, Rosemont, Illinois	IBF USBA Cruiserweight Title.
Win	13-0-2	(United States) Jason Waller	TKO	3	15/01/2004	(United States) Arena Theater, Houston, Texas	Referee stopped the bout at 2:38 of the third round.
Win	12-0-2	(Mexico) Jesus Valadez	TKO	3	05/12/2003	(United States) International Ballroom, Houston, Texas	Referee stopped the bout at 2:49 of the third round.
Win	11-0-2	(United States) Alonzo "Big Country" Wright	UD	8	09/08/2003	(United States) Miami Arena, Miami, Florida	
Draw	10-0-2	(United States) Derrick James	PTS	6	27/06/2003	(United States) Centennial Building, Dallas, Texas	
Draw	10-0-1	(United States) Michael Simms	PTS	10	15/03/2003	(United States) UIC Pavilion, Chicago, Illinois	
Win	10-0	(United States) Rodney McSwain	UD	8	03/08/2002	(United States) Dodge Theatre, Phoenix, Arizona	
Win	9-0	(United States) Gary Gomez	UD	8	27/06/2002	(United States) Santa Ana Star Casino, Bernalillo, New Mexico	
Win	8-0	(United States) Kenny Snow	UD	4	09/04/2002	(United States) Ramada Inn, Rosemont, Illinois	
Win	7-0	(United States) Chris Thomas	UD	6	25/01/2002	(United States) Ramada Inn, Rosemont, Illinois	
Win	6-0	(United States) Harold Lee Lowe, Jr.	TKO	1	21/12/2001	(United States) Pechanga Resort and Casino, Temecula, California	Referee stopped the bout at 0:43 of the first round.
Win	5-0	(United States) Shawn Townsend	KO	1	26/10/2001	(United States) Pechanga Resort and Casino, Temecula, California	Townsend knocked out at 2:05 of the first round.
Win	4-0	(United States) Kwan Manassah	UD	4	25/05/2001	(United States) Mystic Lake Casino, Prior Lake, Minnesota	
Win	3-0	(United States) Ernest Parfait	TKO	1	25/01/2001	(United States) Radisson Hotel, Houston, Texas	Referee stopped the bout at 1:35 of the first round.
Win	2-0	(United States) James Smith	TKO	1	26/10/2000	(United States) Radisson Hotel, Houston, Texas	Referee stopped the bout at 0:34 of the first round.
Win	1-0	(United States) Mitchell Seigrist	TKO	2	21/09/2000	(United States) Houston, Texas	
