= Mario Daser =

German boxer

Personal information
- Nationality: German
- Born: 14 November 1988 (age 37) Munich, West Germany

Boxing career
- Stance: Orthodox

Boxing record
- Total fights: 13
- Wins: 13
- Win by KO: 6
- Losses: 0
- Draws: 0

Mario Daser (born 14 November 1988) is a German professional boxer who held the WBO European cruiserweight title in 2017.

== Professional boxing record ==
Result	Record	Opponent	Type	Time	Date	Location	Notes
8	win	13-0	(United Kingdom) Ola Afolabi	TKO	19 May 2017	Barclaycard Arena, Hamburg, Germany	Won vacant WBO European and IBO International cruiserweight titles
12	win	12-0	(Bosnia and Herzegovina) Drazan Janjanin	RTD	28 Oct 2016	Zirkustelt, Hamburg, Germany	
11	win	11-0	(Croatia) Aleksandar Todorovic	PTS	4 Aug 2016	ECB Boxgym, Hamburg, Germany	
10	win	10-0	(United States) Jermaine Bland	MD	16 Jul 2011	(Germany) Olympia-Eissportzentrum, Munich	
9	win	9-0	(Romania) Adrian Cerneaga	TKO	19 Jun 2011	(Germany) Festzelt Geisenfeld, Ingolstadt	
8	win	8-0	(Romania) Adrian Cerneaga	PTS	13 Jun 2011	(Germany) Festzelt Unterschleissheim, Munich	
7	win	7-0	(United States) Jermaine Bland	PTS	2 Jun 2011	(Germany) Trudering, Munich	
6	win	6-0	(Czech Republic) Julius Pokos	TKO	4 Oct 2009	(Germany) Amberger Herbstdult, Amberg	
5	win	5-0	(United States) Jermaine Bland	PTS	3 Oct 2009	(Germany) Festzelt, Ludwigshafen	
4	win	4-0	(Bosnia and Herzegovina) Pajo Peci	TKO	15 Aug 2009	(Germany) Festzelt, Friedberg	
3	win	3-0	(Germany) Frank Pflegel	PTS	27 Jul 2009	(Germany) Festzelt, Geretsried	
2	win	2-0	(Croatia) Robert Igrec	PTS	24 May 2009	(Germany) Festzelt, Grafing	
1	win	1-0	(Turkey) Ramazan Oezsevgec	TKO	21 May 2009	(Germany) Festzelt, Wertingen	
