= Vadim Tokarev =

Russian boxer

Vadim Tokarev (born 29 February 1972) is a US-based Russian professional boxer who competed from 2000 to 2008.

== Professional career ==
Born in Yekaterinburg, Tokarev began his professional career in 2000 and won his first 15 fights in a row. He has a record of 26 wins, 1 loss, and 1 draw. He was undefeated in his first 24 fights picking up the Russian, IBF Inter-Continental and NABF cruiserweight titles.

His only defeat came against Marco Huck in an eliminator fight for the IBF Cruiserweight Title.

== Professional boxing record ==
26 Wins (19 knockouts, 7 decisions), 1 Losses (0 knockouts, 1 decision), 1 Draw
Result	Record	Opponent	Type	Round	Date	Location	Notes
Win	17-15-1	Manu Ntoh	TKO	8	27/11/2008	Saint Petersburg, Russia	Referee stopped the bout at 0:50 of the eighth round.
Win	16-8-2	Chris Thomas	TKO	3	03/10/2008	Saint Petersburg, Russia	Referee stopped the bout at 2:25 of the third round.
Win	23-9	Marlon Hayes	TKO	3	13/10/2007	Moscow, Russia	Referee stopped the bout at 2:43 of the third round.
Loss	18-0	Marco Huck	MD	12	26/05/2007	Bamberg, Germany	
Win	18-4	Shane Swartz	KO	2	25/11/2006	Warsaw, Poland	NABF Cruiserweight Title. Swartz knocked out at 0:40 of the second round.
Win	18-0-2	Felix Cora Jr.	TKO	4	18/05/2006	Hollywood, Florida, U.S.	NABF Cruiserweight Title. Referee stopped the bout at 2:52 of the fourth round.
Win	3-0-1	Ali Ismailov	RTD	8	17/02/2006	Kazan, Russia	Ismailov retired at 3:00 of the eighth round.
Win	18-1-3	Darnell Wilson	UD	10	18/08/2005	Kazan, Russia	
Win	16-2-1	Michael Simms	UD	10	13/05/2005	Kazan, Russia	
Win	11-4-1	Troy Beets	KO	5	01/10/2004	Kazan, Russia	IBF Intercontinental Cruiserweight Title.
Win	38-9-1	Arthur Williams	UD	10	29/04/2004	Kazan, Russia	
Win	18-1-3	Darnell Wilson	UD	10	29/04/2004	Kazan, Russia	
Win	10-1-1	Marvin Aguilar	TKO	3	20/12/2003	Podolsk, Russia	IBF Intercontinental Cruiserweight Title.
Draw	18-2	Firat Arslan	PTS	12	16/08/2003	Nürburg, Germany	IBF Intercontinental Cruiserweight Title.
Win	15-5	George Sabuni	TKO	1	11/06/2003	Kazan, Russia	IBF Intercontinental Cruiserweight Title.
Win	13-3	Merick Roberge	KO	2	15/03/2003	Kazan, Russia	IBF Intercontinental Cruiserweight Title.
Win	13-8-1	Valeri Semiskur	TKO	2	25/12/2002	Kazan, Russia	
Win	25-6-1	Muslim Biarslanov	UD	10	03/11/2002	Ekaterinburg, Russia	Russia Cruiserweight Title.
Win	5-9	Goran Dinic	KO	2	21/09/2002	Kazan, Russia	
Win	0-6	Evgeny Galchenko	TKO	3	04/07/2002	Ekaterinburg, Russia	
Win	1-0	Dmitry Lyakhovetsky	TKO	2	18/04/2002	Ekaterinburg, Russia	
Win	8-11-2	Sergey Korolev	UD	10	28/02/2002	Ekaterinburg, Russia	Russia Cruiserweight Title.
Win	0-4	Dmitry Gerasimov	TKO	5	22/12/2001	Kazan, Russia	
Win	0-11	Timofey Maklakov	TKO	2	28/10/2001	Ekaterinburg, Russia	
Win	16-14	Teymuraz Kekelidze	TKO	2	20/09/2001	Ekaterinburg, Russia	Ural & Siberia Cruiserweight Title.
Win	1-13	Valery Makeev	TKO	5	31/05/2001	Ekaterinburg, Russia	
Win	0-2	Artem Vychkin	TKO	2	15/03/2001	Ekaterinburg, Russia	
Win	0-1	Denis Deryabkin	UD	6	08/02/2001	Ekaterinburg, Russia	
Win	0-1	Vitaly Mugunov	UD	6	08/12/2000	Ekaterinburg, Russia	
