= Tommy Brooks =

American boxer and trainer (1954–2025)

Tommy Brooks (June 6, 1954 – July 29, 2025) was an American boxing trainer and a boxer. He is best known as the trainer of Evander Holyfield.

== Amateur boxing career ==
As an amateur Brooks was the 1975 National AAU Middleweight champion.

== Professional boxing career ==
Brooks turned professional and had a reported career record of 7–3. After his boxing career he became a trainer.

== Boxing trainer ==
Among the boxers/boxing world champions who have trained under Brooks at some point of their career are:

- Evander Holyfield
- Mike Tyson
- Michael Grant
- Larry Donald
- Vitali Klitschko
- Wladimir Klitschko
- Vassiliy Jirov
- Mike McCallum
- Johnny Bumphus
- Meldrick Taylor
- Charles Murray
- Freddie Pendleton
- Rocky Lockridge
- Junior Jones
- Shaun George
- Yuri Foreman
- Tony Jeffries
- David Price

== Death ==
Brooks died of cancer on July 29, 2025, at the age of 71.
