= Kevin Lerena =

South African boxer (born 1992)

Personal information
- Nicknames: 2 Guns; The KO Kid
- Born: 5 May 1992 (age 34) Johannesburg, South Africa
- Height: 6 ft 1 in (1.85 m)
- Weight: Cruiserweight; Bridgerweight; Heavyweight

Boxing career
- Stance: Southpaw

Boxing record
- Total fights: 37
- Wins: 32
- Win by KO: 15
- Losses: 5

Kevin Lerena (born 5 May 1992) is a South African professional boxer. He held the World Boxing Council (WBC) bridgerweight title from 2024 to May 2026. Previously, he held the International Boxing Organization (IBO) cruiserweight title from 2017 to 2021. At regional level, he has held multiple championships, including the South African title from 2015 to 2017.

== Professional career ==
=== Early career ===
Lerena made his professional debut against Justice Siliga on 30 November 2011, and won the fight by a second-round knockout. He amassed a 12–1 record during the next four years, before challenging Deon Coetzee for the South African cruiserweight title. He beat Coetzee by unanimous decision. He made his first and only title defense against Johnny Muller on 24 April 2016. He won the fight by a tenth-round technical knockout.

==== Lerena vs. Bolonti ====
Lerena faced the one-time WBA World light heavyweight title challenger Roberto Bolonti on 11 June 2016. He won the fight by unanimous decision, with scores of 97–93, 97–93 and 96–94.

==== Lerena vs. Nielsen ====
Lerena faced the undefeated Micki Nielsen on 22 October 2016. He won the fight by majority decision. Two judges scored the bout 96–95 and 97–93 in his favor, while the third judge scored it as a 95–95 draw.

Lerena fought Vikapita Meroro on 4 February 2017. He won the fight by a fifth-round technical knockout. Meroro appeared to go down easy, while led fight promoter Rodney Berman to withhold his purse and state: "He quit, plain and simple".

Lerena fought Sergio Ramirez on 23 April 2017. He won the fight by unanimous decision, after the eight scheduled rounds were contested. It was the first time in three years that Lerena was scheduled to fight less than ten rounds.

=== IBO cruiserweight champion ===
==== Lerena vs. Kalenga ====
Lerena was scheduled to face Maxim Maslov for the vacant IBO cruiserweight title on 12 August 2017, at the Emperors Palace in Kempton Park, South Africa. On 25 July, Maslov announced his withdrawal from the bout due to a recurring injury. He was replaced by the former WBC Continental cruiserweight champion Olanrewaju Durodola. Durodola later withdrew from the bout as well, and was replaced by the former interim WBA Cruiserweight titlist Youri Kalenga. As Kalenga stepped in on ten days notice, the fight itself was postponed for 9 September 2017. Lerena won the fight by split decision, with two judges awarding him 116–113 and 115–113 scorecards, while the third judge scored it 117–111 for Kalenga. Kalenga threw a great volume of hooks and power punches in the early rounds, which were awarded to him on all three of the judges cards. Lerena was able to rally in the mid rounds however, and did enough to edge the fight in his favor.

==== Lerena vs. Kucher ====
Lerena made the first defense of his IBO title against the #13 ranked WBC cruiserweight contender Dmytro Kucher. The bout was scheduled as the headliner of the Emperors Palace fight card, which was held on 3 March 2018. Fight promoter Golden Gloves announced that the winner of the title fight would face Roman Golovashchenko just six weeks later. Lerena won the fight by a wide unanimous decision, with two judges awarding him eleven of the twelve contested rounds, while the third judge scored the fight 117–111 for Lerena.

True to their word, promoter Golden Gloves scheduled Lerena to face Roman Golovashchenko in his second IBO cruiserweight title defense. Lerena entered the bout as the #6 ranked WBC and #4 ranked IBF contender, while Golovashchenko wasn't at the time highly regarded by any of the four major boxing governing bodies. He won the fight by unanimous decision, with scores of 116–111, 115–112 and 115–112. Lerena scored the sole knockdown of the fight in the fifth round, dropping Golovashchenko with a left hand, although he was unable to finish his opponent.

In 2018 he tested positive for a banned substance by the Voluntary Anti-Doping Association. He was cleared of any wrongdoing by the IBO on 2 February 2019.

==== Lerena vs. Mann ====
Lerena made the third defense of his IBO title against the undefeated Artur Mann. The fight was scheduled for 16 March 2019, to be contested at the Emperors Palace in Kempton Park, South Africa. Lerena won the fight by a fourth-round technical knockout. He first knocked Mann down twice in the second round, with an uppercut and a flurry of punches. Mann was able to survive the third round, but was stopped by another flurry of punches in the fourth round, with 23 seconds left.

==== Lerena vs. Ducar ====
Lerena made his fourth IBO title defense against Vasil Ducar on 8 June 2019. As Ducar was vastly less experienced with only nine fights up to that point, and as he hadn't faced the same level of competition as Lerena, he came into the fight as a significant underdog. Lerena won the fight by a wide unanimous decision, with scores of 120–108, 119–109 and 117–111.

==== Lerena vs. Seferi ====
Lerena was scheduled to make his fifth IBO title defense against Sefer Seferi on 21 September 2019, at the Emperors Palace in Kempton Park, South Africa. The 40-year old Seferi came into the fight as the #30 ranked IBO cruiserweight contender, and was seen as a large underdog. Lerena won the fight by a third-round technical knockout. He landed a left hook to the body, followed by a left hook to the head, which floored Seferi. As Seferi was unable to rise from the canvas, referee Jean Robert Laine decided to stop the fight.

==== Lerena vs. Arslan ====
Lerena made his sixth IBO title defense against the two-time WBO title challenger Firat Arslan on 8 February 2020, at the EWS Arena in Göppingen, Germany. He beat the 49-year old by a sixth-round technical knockout. Lerena staggered his opponent with a left hook, and landed a number of unanswered punches, which forced Arslan's corner to throw in the towel.

=== Heavyweight ===
Lerena faced Patrick Ferguson in a non-title, heavyweight bout on 19 December 2020, at the Emperors Palace in Kempton Park, South Africa. The bout, as well as the entire card that it headlined, was broadcast on UFC Fight Pass. Lerena won the fight by a fifth-round technical knockout.

==== Lerena vs. Dinu ====
Lerena faced Bogdan Dinu for the vacant WBA Inter-Continental heavyweight title on 26 March 2022. Lerena captured his first heavyweight title with a fourth-round knockout of Dinu.

==== Lerena vs. Wach ====
Lerena fought the one-time unified heavyweight title challenger Mariusz Wach on 17 September 2022, at the Emperors Palace in Kempton Park, South Africa. He won the fight by unanimous decision, with scores of 120–108, 120–108, and 118–110.

=== WBA (Regular) heavyweight title challenge ===
==== Lerena vs. Dubois ====
Lerena challenged Daniel Dubois for the WBA (Regular) heavyweight title on Dec 3, 2022 at the Tottenham Hotspur Stadium in London, England. Both boxers trash talked during the final presser. Dubois weighed 240.25 pounds and Lerena came in at a lean 231 pounds. Although he was knocked down in the first round 3 times, Dubois prevailed and won by 3rd round technical knockout. Dubois was dropped by Lerena's left hand on all three occasions. Dubois still looked hurt going into round 2. In round 3, Dubois dropped Lerena with a massive right hand to the head. Dubois then landed several big uppercuts to put Lerena on the canvas as the bell rang. Referee Howard Foster stopped the fight as Lerena picked himself up from the canvas.

=== Bridgerweight ===
==== Lerena vs. Merhy ====
Lerena faced the former WBA (Regular) cruiserweight titleholder Ryad Merhy in a WBC bridgerweight title eliminator on 13 May 2023, at the Emperors Palace in Kempton Park, South Africa. He won the fight by unanimous decision, with scores of 118–110, 116–112 and 115–113.

==== Lerena vs. Gashi ====
Lerena faced Senad Gashi for the vacant WBC interim bridgerweight title on 25 November 2023, at the Emperors Palace in Kempton Park, South Africa. He won the fight by unanimous decision, with scores of 114–113, 118–109 and 117–110.

=== Return to heavyweight ===
==== Lerena vs. Huni ====
On 8 March 2024 in Riyadh, Saudi Arabia, Lerena was defeated by Justis Huni via unanimous decision.

=== WBC bridgerweight champion ===
Having been named mandatory challenger, Lerena became WBC bridgerweight champion on 8 October 2024, after Lawrence Okolie vacated the title.

He made the first defense of his title against Serhiy Radchenko at SunBet Arena in Pretoria, South Africa on 1 May 2025, winning by stoppage in the third round.

=== Return to heavyweight ===
==== Lerena vs Okolie ====
Fighting at heavyweight, Lerena lost to Lawrence Okolie by unanimous decision at Wembley Stadium in London on 19 July 2025.

== Professional boxing record ==
37 fights	32 wins	5 losses
By knockout	15	1
By decision	17	4

No.	Result	Record	Opponent	Type	Round, time	Date	Location	Notes
37	Win	32–5	Scott Forrest	UD	10	7 Nov 2026	Sandton Convention Center, Johannesburg, South Africa	Won vacant WBC International cruiserweight title
36	Loss	31–5	Ryad Merhy	UD	12	30 May 2026	Hall des Expositions, Charleroi, Belgium	Lost WBC bridgerweight title
35	Loss	31–4	Lawrence Okolie	UD	10	19 Jul 2025	Wembley Stadium, London, England	For WBC Silver heavyweight title
34	Win	31–3	Serhiy Radchenko	TKO	3 (12) 0:16	1 May 2025	SunBet Arena, Pretoria, South Africa	Retained WBC bridgerweight title
33	Loss	30–3	Justis Huni	UD	10	8 Mar 2024	Kingdom Arena, Riyadh, Saudi Arabia	For vacant WBO Global heavyweight title
32	Win	30–2	Senad Gashi	UD	12	25 Nov 2023	Emperors Palace, Kempton Park, South Africa	Won vacant WBC interim bridgerweight title
31	Win	29–2	Ryad Merhy	UD	12	13 May 2023	Emperors Palace, Kempton Park, South Africa	Won vacant WBC Silver bridgerweight title
30	Loss	28–2	Daniel Dubois	TKO	3 (12), 3:00	3 Dec 2022	Tottenham Hotspur Stadium, London, England	For WBA (Regular) heavyweight title
29	Win	28–1	Mariusz Wach	UD	10	17 Sep 2022	Emperors Palace, Kempton Park, South Africa	Won vacant IBO Inter-Continental heavyweight title
28	Win	27–1	Bogdan Dinu	KO	4 (10), 2:59	26 Mar 2022	Emperors Palace, Kempton Park, South Africa	Won vacant WBA Inter-Continental heavyweight title
27	Win	26–1	Patrick Ferguson	TKO	5 (10), 1:49	19 Dec 2020	Emperors Palace, Kempton Park, South Africa	
26	Win	25–1	Firat Arslan	TKO	6 (12), 1:13	8 Feb 2020	EWS Arena, Göppingen, Germany	Retained IBO cruiserweight title
25	Win	24–1	Sefer Seferi	TKO	3 (12), 2:30	21 Sep 2019	Emperors Palace, Kempton Park, South Africa	Retained IBO cruiserweight title
24	Win	23–1	Vasil Ducar	UD	12	8 Jun 2019	Emperors Palace, Kempton Park, South Africa	Retained IBO cruiserweight title
23	Win	22–1	Artur Mann	TKO	4 (12), 2:37	16 Mar 2019	Emperors Palace, Kempton Park, South Africa	Retained IBO cruiserweight title
22	Win	21–1	Roman Golovashchenko	UD	12	2 Jun 2018	Sarhadci Olympic Center, Baku, Azerbaijan	Retained IBO cruiserweight title
21	Win	20–1	Dmytro Kucher	UD	12	3 Mar 2018	Emperors Palace, Kempton Park, South Africa	Retained IBO cruiserweight title
20	Win	19–1	Youri Kayembre Kalenga	SD	12	9 Sep 2017	Emperors Palace, Kempton Park, South Africa	Won vacant IBO cruiserweight title
19	Win	18–1	Sergio Ramirez	UD	8	23 Apr 2017	Emperors Palace, Kempton Park, South Africa	
18	Win	17–1	Vikapita Meroro	TKO	5 (10), 1:07	4 Feb 2017	Emperors Palace, Kempton Park, South Africa	
17	Win	16–1	Micki Nielsen	MD	10	22 Oct 2016	Emperors Palace, Kempton Park, South Africa	
16	Win	15–1	Roberto Bolonti	UD	10	11 Jun 2016	Emperors Palace, Kempton Park, South Africa	
15	Win	14–1	Johnny Muller	TKO	10 (12), 3:00	24 Apr 2016	Emperors Palace, Kempton Park, South Africa	Retained South African cruiserweight title; Won vacant WBA Pan African cruiserweight title
14	Win	13–1	Deon Coetzee	UD	12	30 Jul 2015	Emperors Palace, Kempton Park, South Africa	Won South African cruiserweight title
13	Win	12–1	Igor Pylypenko	UD	6	14 Mar 2015	Super Arena, Ballerup, Denmark	
12	Loss	11–1	Johnny Muller	UD	10	15 Nov 2014	Emperors Palace, Kempton Park, South Africa	
11	Win	11–0	Gogita Gorgiladze	KO	3 (10), 0:58	29 Sep 2014	Emperors Palace, Kempton Park, South Africa	Won inaugural WBC Youth Silver cruiserweight title
10	Win	10–0	Marcos Antonio Aumada	UD	8	9 Aug 2014	Emperors Palace, Kempton Park, South Africa	
9	Win	9–0	Big Ben Marcell Mulumba	PTS	6	22 Nov 2013	Cape Sun Hotel, Cape Town, South Africa	
8	Win	8–0	Ibrahim Labaran	TKO	2 (12), 0:30	21 Sep 2013	Heartfelt Arena, Pretoria, South Africa	Won inaugural WBF Africa cruiserweight title
7	Win	7–0	Khayeni Hlungwane	PTS	6	27 Jul 2013	North Town Hall, Pretoria, South Africa	
6	Win	6–0	Javier Corrales	UD	6	16 Feb 2013	Emperors Palace, Kempton Park, South Africa	
5	Win	5–0	Jean Lutete Kamba	TKO	3 (6), 2:26	19 Nov 2012	Cresta Shopping Centre, Johannesburg, South Africa	
4	Win	4–0	Alex Mbaya	TKO	1 (4), 2:11	4 Oct 2012	Turffontein Racecourse, Johannesburg, South Africa	
3	Win	3–0	Lucas Jere	TKO	1 (4), 0:53	16 Jun 2012	Emperors Palace, Kempton Park, South Africa	
2	Win	2–0	Gerson Singo	KO	1 (4), 2:59	26 Mar 2012	Emperors Palace, Kempton Park, South Africa	
1	Win	1–0	Justice Siliga	KO	2 (4), 2:43	30 Nov 2011	Emperors Palace, Kempton Park, South Africa	

Sporting positions
Regional boxing titles
New title	WBF Africa cruiserweight champion 21 September 2013 – August 2017; Vacated	Vacant Title next held by Chamunorwa Gonorenda
New title	WBC Youth Silver cruiserweight champion 29 September 2014 – October 2015; Vacated	Next: Jack Massey
Preceded by Deon Coetzee	South African cruiserweight champion 30 July 2015 – June 2017; Vacated	Next: Thabiso Mchunu
Vacant Title last held by Anthony McCracken	WBA Pan African cruiserweight champion 24 April 2016 – March 2018; Vacated	Vacant
Vacant Title last held by Michael Hunter	WBA Inter-Continental heavyweight champion 26 March 2022 – August 2022; Vacated	Vacant Title next held by Murat Gassiev
Vacant Title last held by Zhan Kossobutskiy	IBO Inter-Continental heavyweight champion 17 September 2022 – December 2024; Vacated	Vacant Title next held by Granit Shala
Vacant Title last held by Alen Babić	WBC Silver bridgerweight champion 13 May 2023 – 25 November 2023; Won interim title	Vacant Title next held by Serhiy Radchenko
Vacant Title last held by Aloys Youmbi	WBC International cruiserweight champion 7 November 2026 – present	Incumbent
Minor world boxing titles
Vacant Title last held by Marco Huck	IBO cruiserweight champion 9 September 2017 – October 2021; Vacated	Next: Jack Massey
Major world boxing titles
New title	WBC bridgerweight champion Interim title 25 November 2023 − 8 October 2024; Promoted	Vacant
Vacant Title last held by Lawrence Okolie	WBC bridgerweight champion 8 October 2024 – 30 May 2026	Succeeded by Ryad Merhy
