= Marco Huck =

German boxer (born 1984)

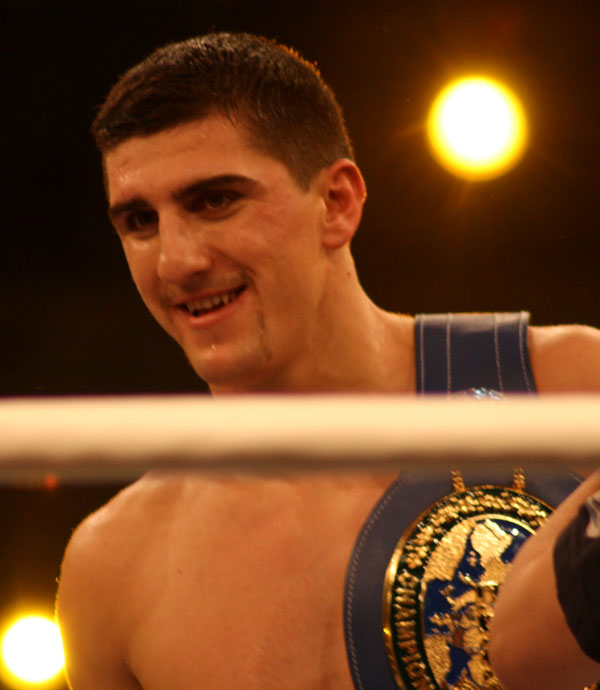
- Huck in 2008

Personal information
- Nickname: Käpt'n ("Captain")
- Nationality: German
- Born: Muamer Hukić; 11 November 1984 (age 42) Ugao, SR Serbia, SFR Yugoslavia
- Height: 1.88 m (6 ft 2 in)
- Weight: Cruiserweight; Bridgerweight; Heavyweight

Boxing career
- Reach: 195 cm (77 in)
- Stance: Orthodox

Boxing record
- Total fights: 51
- Wins: 46
- Win by KO: 28
- Losses: 5
- Draws: 1
- No contests: 1

Muamer Hukić (born 11 November 1984), best known as Marco Huck, is a Bosniak German professional boxer. He held the WBO cruiserweight title from 2009 to 2015, and is the joint-longest reigning cruiserweight world champion of all time, having made thirteen consecutive successful defenses, a division record shared with Johnny Nelson. Huck also held the IBO cruiserweight title from 2016 to 2017, the European cruiserweight title from 2008 to 2009, and has challenged once for the WBA (Regular) heavyweight title in 2012.

== Early life ==
Huck was born into a bosniakicised Albanian family from the village of Ugao, in Serbia (Sandžak region). He moved to Germany with his family when he was eight years old and has since become a naturalized citizen.

== Kickboxing career ==
Huck started Taekwondo and Kickboxing at the age of ten. As an amateur kickboxer, he won a gold medal at the W.A.K.O European championships in 2002 and 2003.

=== Kickboxing highlights ===
Amateur Kickboxing

- 2003 W.A.K.O. World Championships 2003 in Paris, France (gold) −86 kg (Full-Contact)
- 2002 W.A.K.O. European Championships in Jesolo, Italy (gold) −86 kg (Full-Contact)

== Professional boxing career ==
=== Cruiserweight ===
==== Early career ====
Huck decided to switch to boxing, having participated in the sport since he was 15.

Huck has notable victories over opponents such as Michael Simms, Claudio Rîșco, Pietro Aurino and Vadim Tokarev. Before challenging for his first world title, Huck gained a record of 19 wins with no losses.

==== Huck vs. Cunningham ====
Huck challenged Steve Cunningham on 29 December 2007 for his first world title, the IBF Cruiserweight title. After eleven hard fought and exhausting rounds, the twelfth begun; Cunningham was landing hard shots as Huck kept moving forward. Following a rough clinch between the two, Cunningham landed a vicious straight right counter, the fighters clinched and Huck fell. Once he was back on his feet, Huck walked back against the ropes signalling that the shot had hurt him and Cunningham went straight in for the attack. For the remainder of the round, Cunningham chased his German counterpart across the ring hitting him with a barrage of hard shots which ended when Huck's corner threw in the towel and ended the beating.

==== European champion ====
Huck won the EBU (European) cruiserweight title in September 2008 after defeating Jean Marc Monrose via a 12th round stoppage win. Huck made three successful defences defeating Fabio Tuiach, Geoffrey Battelo and Vitaliy Rusal, with all coming inside the distance.

==== Huck vs. Ramirez ====
On 29 August 2009, Huck challenged Argentine boxer Victor Emilio Ramírez for his WBO cruiserweight title at the Gerry Weber Stadium in Halle, Germany. On fight night, Huck went the 12 round distance and claimed the WBO title on unanimous decision. The judges score it 116–111, 116–111, and 115–112 in favour of Huck.

==== Title defences ====
Huck went on to make 8 successful defenses of the title from December 2009 up until October 2011. Notable opponents he defeated included unanimous decisions over Ran Nakash and Ola Afolabi, the latter who he went on to fight a further three times, TKO wins over Matt Godfrey and Brian Minto and a split decision win over future unified world champion Denis Lebedev.

=== Heavyweight ===
==== Huck vs. Povetkin ====
After a string of defenses, Huck challenged Alexander Povetkin for the WBA heavyweight title. In December 2011, a deal was reached for Povetkin to make his second defence against Huck on 25 February 2012 at Porsche Arena in Stuttgart, Baden-Württemberg. Huck made the challenge in the post fight press conference of Povetkin's win over Cedric Boswell. It was noted that Huck would not vacate his WBO title, until after the fight, where he would assess the situation. Huck stated if he was to win the title, he would likely remain at heavyweight to challenge one of the Klitschko brothers, but would be given 10 days by the WBO to decide. Huck reached out to David Haye and Evander Holyfield to help with sparring. In January 2012, the promoters of Huck, Povetkin and Rahman attended a meeting where they discussed the winner of Povetkin vs. Huck would defend the WBA title against Rahman next. During this time, trainer Teddy Atlas failed to travel to Russia and announced he had parted ways with Povetkin. Russian trainer Alexander Zimin stepped in on short notice. For his debut at heavyweight, Huck weighed 209.4 pounds and Povetkin weighed 229.2 pounds.

Povetkin won the fight via majority decision. The fight proved to be a tough test for Povetkin. One judge scored the fight a 114–114 draw, with the remaining two judges scoring the fight 116–113 and 116–112 in favour of Povetkin. All three ringside announcers from EPIX scored the fight in favour of Huck. Chisora and Dimitrenko, who were sat ringside, scored the fight a draw. Arthur Abraham and Tomasz Adamek scored the fight clearly for Huck. The opening round started off slow however Povetkin started taking over the fight landing body shots and using his straight rights. In round 4, Huck began to let his hands go and found his range, even rocking Povetkin. Huck controlled the championship rounds as Povetkin began to show signs of fatigue. Huck came close to dropping Povetkin in the final round. After the fight, Povetkin admitted, "I underestimated him. Perhaps I didn't take this fight seriously enough." Huck said, "A lot of people who saw this fight see me as the winner." It was reported that Huck had injured his right between rounds 6 and 7. The verdict was met with boos around the arena.

=== Return to cruiserweight ===
==== Huck vs. Afolabi II ====
After failing to capture a heavyweight title, Huck returned to the cruiserweight division. Huck made a ninth successful defence on 5 May 2012 at the Messehalle in Erfurt, Germany against Ola Afolabi (19–2–3, 9 KOs), a rematch to their first match which took place in 2009. The match ended in a majority draw as judge Ingo Barrabas and Paul Thomas had it 114–114 and Zoltan Enyedi scored it 115–113 in Huck's favour.

==== Huck vs. Arslan ====
Huck next defended his title against German boxer Firat Arslan (32–5–2, 21 KOs) at the Gerry Weber Stadium in Halle, Nordrhein-Westfalen on 3 November. Huck defeated Arslan via 12 round unanimous decision, after the scores of 115–113, 115–113, and 117–111. Many fans and pundits ringside felt as though Arslan had done enough to win. Arslan's coach Dieter Wittmann commented, "This fight was the biggest scam that I've ever seen. It's a disgrace."

==== Huck vs. Afolabi III ====
Following the controversial ending were Huck defeated Arslan, the WBO made Ola Afolabi as the new mandatory challenger for Huck's WBO title. The fight took place at the Max Schmeling Halle in Berlin on 8 June 2013. Afolabi had not fought in 13 months, last fighting in the majority draw with Huck in May 2012. The fight went the full 12 round distance with Huck claiming the majority decision thus successfully retaining the title an 11th time. The judges score the fight 117–111, 115–113, and 114–114. Huck gathered an early lead in the fight winning at least 5 of the first 7 rounds, before Afolabi started getting into the fight.

==== Huck vs. Arslan II ====
On 25 January 2014, Huck made a defence fighting Firat Arslan for a second time at the Hanns-Martin-Schleyer Halle in Stuttgart. Huck scored his 26th stoppage victory after he stopped Arslan in round 6. Arslan started off the fight defensively, however after a couple of rounds, Huck found his way through with power shots. Huck dropped Arslan twice in the bout.

Huck matched the record for most consecutive world title defenses at cruiserweight, held by Johnny Nelson, when he successfully retained the WBO cruiserweight title against Mirko Larghetti on 30 August 2014, his thirteenth successful consecutive title defense.

==== Huck vs. Głowacki ====
Huck was due to make history against undefeated Krzysztof Głowacki, as it was to be his fourteenth defense, a new record. The bout took place on 14 August 2015 in Huck's American debut at the Prudential Center in Newark, New Jersey, on Premier Boxing Champions. Głowacki came out extremely aggressive and was effective early, going as far as to rock Huck in the opening round. As the rounds went on, Huck took control and in the sixth, he dropped his Polish counterpart with a huge left hand, Głowacki staggered to his feet and as the ref allowed the fight to continue, Huck came in to finish and Głowacki threw back everything he had, rocking Huck in the process and keeping him from ending the bout. The fight continued, and it was becoming more and more clear that Huck was taking control, he hit Głowacki with a huge punch in the tenth but his opponent survived. Coming into the eleventh round Huck was ahead on all three scorecards, he out-boxed the now desperate Głowacki for most of the round. Until after throwing a barrage of shots, Huck moved back with his hands down and Głowacki threw a vicious left-right combination and Huck tumbled back. He got back up on rubbery legs, and as the ref allowed the bout to continue, Głowacki rushed in and threw everything at Huck while he lay on the ropes, he took two huge right hands as he dropped down against the ropes, just as the referee came in and waved off the bout. Huck lost his WBO cruiserweight title and failed to break the record.

==== Huck vs. Afolabi IV ====
Huck met Afolabi for a fourth time on 27 February 27, 2016, at the Gerry Weber Stadium in Germany. Huck claimed Afolabi's International Boxing Organization cruiserweight title with the victory after Afolabi failed return for round 11. Referee Jack Reiss stopped the fight on doctor's advice due to the bad condition of Afolabi's left eye. By round seven Afolabi's left eye was swollen shut. In the Post fight interview, Afolabi stated that he would have continued to fight, but he thanked the officials for protecting him as he was unable to do so.

Huck was scheduled to defend his IBO world title against British boxer Ovill McKenzie (25–12–1, 13 KO's) at the Festhalle Arena in Frankfurt on 24 September. On September 20, a week before the fight, McKenzie pulled out of the fight due to illness. It was said that McKenzie had been given medical advice from health professionals. McKenzie later retired.

==== Huck vs. Kucher ====
On 18 October, it was announced that Huck would be defending his IBO title against Ukrainian boxer Dmytro Kucher (24–1–1, 18 KOs) on 19 November at the TUI Arena in Hanover. Kucher, ranked number 6 by the WBC, was regarded a dangerous first defence, having only lost to world cruiserweight challenger Illunga Makabu. Kucher was coming off an impressive first-round knockout off former WBO champion Enzo Maccrinelli in June, also sending him into retirement. Kucher claimed the EBU title by defeating Maccrinelli. Huck retained his IBO title with a 12-round unanimous decision win over Kucher. Huck was pressured throughout the whole 12 rounds with Kucher adopting a southpaw stance and giving Huck problems. Huck hurt Kucher in the 8th round after landing a hard right hand and then attempted to finish him off, but could only throw him on the canvas. After 12 rounds, the judges scored the fight 117–111, 119–109, and 117–111.

==== Huck vs. Briedis ====
Due to Tony Bellew fighting David Haye instead of taking on mandatory challenger Mairis Briedis (21–0, 18 KOs), the WBC ordered a match for the interim WBC cruiserweight title between Huck and Briedis, where the winner would earn a fight with Bellew for the full WBC title or possibly elevated to full championship status if Bellew decides to vacate and stay at heavyweight. Negotiations were underway with a venue in Germany being discussed with the fight taking place on 1 April 2017. On 18 January, Huck Sports Promotion announced the fight will take place at the Westfalenhalle in Dortmund. Bellew was named WBC Emeritus Champion on 28 March 2017 meaning the winner between Huck and Briedis would become full world champion. Huck failed to capture the vacant WBC title and lost his IBO title in a one sided 12 round unanimous decision loss. The first couple of rounds seemed close as there was not much action, from the third round, Briedis installed the jab and controlled the pace of the fight en route to becoming the first Latvian to win a world title. The three judges scorecards read 118–109, 117–110, and 116–111 in favour or Briedis. Huck confirmed he would not be retiring despite his fourth career loss. "I’m too young to stop. I’m a true warrior. We’ll get the title back", he said.

==== World Boxing Super Series ====
On 27 June 2017 Huck announced that he would be participating in the World Boxing Super Series 8-man tournament which would start in September 2017. In a press release, Huck said, "I am thrilled to be joining the Champions League of Boxing. In the great history of the sport there has never been a tournament like this. Eight world-class fighters will enter the competition but just one man can prevail. I cannot wait to show the world that I am best of all those strong champions." The draw for the bracket style tournament was set to take place on 8 July 2017 in Monte Carlo.

===== Huck vs. Usyk =====
At the Draft Gala, Oleksandr Usyk (12–0, 10 KOs), who was first-seeded, meaning he had the first pick of the tournament, chose to fight Huck in the quarter finals. When Usyk was asked why he chose Huck, he replied that it was because of his fans. Huck, also excited about the fight, said, "This was my wish opponent." The fight, would be contested for Usyk's WBO cruiserweight title. On July 26, it was announced that the fight would take place at the Max-Schmeling-Halle in Berlin on 9 September 2017. This would mark the second time Usyk would fight in Germany in his professional career, having fought there on his third professional bout in April 2014. It would also mark the first fight of the tournament.

On 6 September, at the final press conference, Huck pushed Usyk in the face-off. In regards to the shove, Huck said, "I wanted to show Usyk that he is in my hometown and that he should be prepared for the battle of his life on Saturday." Usyk, who remained professional and calm, replied, "If you want to be a great champion, you have to beat the best and Huck is one of the best. I chose to enter this tournament because it is a path to achieve my dream of unifying all the belts. There's a prestigious trophy at stake too, the Muhammad Ali Trophy. We were born on the same day and I admire Ali because he is the biggest role model in boxing and I will thank God if I win a trophy with his name on it." As he was leaving the building, Usyk claimed he would 'bury' Huck.

On fight night, Usyk used his footwork and combination punching to cruise to a TKO win. On top of his dominant performance, Usyk taunted Huck throughout the fight. In round 8, Usyk tripped on Huck's feet and Huck lost a point on the scorecards as he threw a punch at Usyk when the latter was down. Usyk continued to land combinations with little to no response from Huck until referee Robert Byrd stopped the fight in the tenth round. With the win, Usyk progressed to the semi-final stage of the Super Series and is slated to face the winner of the Mairis Briedis–Mike Perez fight. Huck has now suffered back to back defeats for the first time in his career.

=== Return to heavyweight ===
On 12 October 2017, Huck told German tabloid BILD, that he would not be retiring from the sport, but rather continue his career in 2018 campaigning once again at heavyweight. Huck made the decision after suffering his second stoppage loss in his last five fights. Huck fought his only heavyweight fight in 2012, unsuccessfully challenging Alexander Povetkin for the WBA 'Regular' title. On 4 April 2018, Huck Box Promotion and Petko's Box Promotion jointly announced that Huck would be returning on a card in Munich on 16 June 2018 at heavyweight. On 9 April, 41 year old Turkish-born German boxer Yakup Saglam (40–4–0, 37 KOs) was announced as Huck's opponent. Huck stopped Saglam in round 4 via TKO of their scheduled 10-round bout. The fight came to an end 26 seconds into round 4, when Saglam's corner threw in the towel.

==== Huck vs. Guivas ====
Almost 4 years after his US debut, Huck had his second fight in the US against Nick Guivas on 17 May 2019. Huck dropped Guivas twice in the first round, and was initially awarded the TKO victory. However, after a review it was announced that the second knockdown was caused by an accidental foul. The fight was called a no-contest after the review.

==== Huck vs. Lewandowski ====
On 29 August 2020, Huck fought Dennis Lewandowski. Huck dominated Lewadowski and won every round en route to a unanimous decision victory.

==== Huck vs. Lazaridis ====
Huck defeated Evgenios Lazaridis via unanimous decision at the Estrel Hotel in Berlin on 29 June 2024.

==== Huck vs. Pejsar ====
After almost 20 months away from the competitive boxing ring, Huck faced Vaclav Pejsar at Heristo Arena in Halle on 14 February 2026. He won the 10-round contest, which was fought at heavyweight, by unanimous decision.

== Professional boxing record ==
51 fights	44 wins	5 losses
By knockout	28	3
By decision	16	2
Draws	1	
No contests	1	

No.	Result	Record	Opponent	Type	Round, time	Date	Location	Notes
51	Win	44–5–1 (1)	Vaclav Pejsar	UD	10	14 Feb 2026	Heristo Arena, Halle, Germany	
50	Win	43–5–1 (1)	Evgenios Lazaridis	UD	10	29 Jun 2024	Estrel Hotel, Berlin, Germany	
49	Win	42–5–1 (1)	Dennis Lewandowski	UD	10	29 Aug 2020	Eisstadion, Braunlage, Germany	
48	NC	41–5–1 (1)	Nick Guivas	TKO	1 (8), 0:57	17 May 2019	Foxwoods Resort Casino, Ledyard, Connecticut, US	Originally a TKO win for Huck, later ruled an NC after an incorrect referee call
47	Win	41–5–1	Yakup Saglam	TKO	4 (10), 0:26	16 Jun 2018	Ballhausforum, Munich, Germany	
46	Loss	40–5–1	Oleksandr Usyk	TKO	10 (12), 2:12	9 Sep 2017	Max-Schmeling-Halle, Berlin, Germany	For WBO cruiserweight title; World Boxing Super Series: cruiserweight quarter-final
45	Loss	40–4–1	Mairis Briedis	UD	12	1 Apr 2017	Westfalenhallen, Dortmund, Germany	Lost IBO cruiserweight title; For vacant WBC cruiserweight title
44	Win	40–3–1	Dmytro Kucher	UD	12	19 Nov 2016	TUI Arena, Hanover, Germany	Retained IBO cruiserweight title
43	Win	39–3–1	Ola Afolabi	RTD	10 (12), 3:00	26 Feb 2016	Gerry Weber Stadion, Halle, Germany	Won IBO cruiserweight title
42	Loss	38–3–1	Krzysztof Głowacki	KO	11 (12), 2:39	14 Aug 2015	Prudential Center, Newark, New Jersey, US	Lost WBO cruiserweight title
41	Win	38–2–1	Mirko Larghetti	UD	12	30 Aug 2014	Gerry Weber Stadion, Halle, Germany	Retained WBO cruiserweight title
40	Win	37–2–1	Firat Arslan	TKO	6 (12), 1:56	25 Jan 2014	Hanns-Martin-Schleyer-Halle, Stuttgart, Germany	Retained WBO cruiserweight title
39	Win	36–2–1	Ola Afolabi	MD	12	8 Jun 2013	Max-Schmeling-Halle, Berlin, Germany	Retained WBO cruiserweight title
38	Win	35–2–1	Firat Arslan	UD	12	3 Nov 2012	Gerry Weber Stadion, Halle, Germany	Retained WBO cruiserweight title
37	Draw	34–2–1	Ola Afolabi	MD	12	5 May 2012	Messe, Erfurt, Germany	Retained WBO cruiserweight title
36	Loss	34–2	Alexander Povetkin	MD	12	25 Feb 2012	Porsche-Arena, Stuttgart, Germany	For WBA (Regular) heavyweight title
35	Win	34–1	Rogelio Omar Rossi	KO	6 (12), 1:09	22 Oct 2011	Arena Ludwigsburg, Ludwigsburg, Germany	Retained WBO cruiserweight title
34	Win	33–1	Hugo Garay	TKO	10 (12), 1:10	16 Jul 2011	Olympia Eishalle, Munich, Germany	Retained WBO cruiserweight title
33	Win	32–1	Ran Nakash	UD	12	2 Apr 2011	Gerry Weber Stadion, Halle, Germany	Retained WBO cruiserweight title
32	Win	31–1	Denis Lebedev	SD	12	18 Dec 2010	Max-Schmeling-Halle, Berlin, Germany	Retained WBO cruiserweight title
31	Win	30–1	Matt Godfrey	TKO	5 (12), 2:18	21 Aug 2010	Messe, Erfurt, Germany	Retained WBO cruiserweight title
30	Win	29–1	Brian Minto	RTD	9 (12), 3:00	1 May 2010	Weser-Ems-Halle, Oldenburg, Germany	Retained WBO cruiserweight title
29	Win	28–1	Adam Richards	KO	3 (12), 2:30	13 Mar 2010	Max-Schmeling-Halle, Berlin, Germany	Retained WBO cruiserweight title
28	Win	27–1	Ola Afolabi	UD	12	5 Dec 2009	Arena Ludwigsburg, Ludwigsburg, Germany	Retained WBO cruiserweight title
27	Win	26–1	Victor Emilio Ramírez	UD	12	29 Aug 2009	Gerry Weber Stadion, Halle, Germany	Won WBO cruiserweight title
26	Win	25–1	Vitaliy Rusal	TKO	5 (12), 2:58	9 May 2009	Jako Arena, Bamberg, Germany	Retained European cruiserweight title
25	Win	24–1	Geoffrey Battelo	TKO	3 (12), 2:57	24 Jan 2009	Erdgas Arena, Riesa, Germany	Retained European cruiserweight title
24	Win	23–1	Fabio Tuiach	TKO	2 (12), 2:22	25 Oct 2008	Weser-Ems-Halle, Oldenburg, Germany	Retained European cruiserweight title
23	Win	22–1	Jean Marc Monrose	TKO	12 (12), 1:17	20 Sep 2008	Seidensticker Halle, Bielefeld, Germany	Won European cruiserweight title
22	Win	21–1	Frantisek Kasanic	TKO	9 (12), 2:52	17 May 2008	Oberfrankenhalle, Bayreuth, Germany	Won vacant IBF Inter-Continental cruiserweight title
21	Win	20–1	Leon Nzama	TKO	5 (8), 1:06	12 Apr 2008	Jahnsportforum, Neubrandenburg, Germany	
20	Loss	19–1	Steve Cunningham	TKO	12 (12), 1:56	29 Dec 2007	Seidensticker Halle, Bielefeld, Germany	For IBF cruiserweight title
19	Win	19–0	Vadim Tokarev	UD	12	26 May 2007	Jako Arena, Bamberg, Germany	
18	Win	18–0	Ismail Abdoul	UD	12	20 Jan 2007	St. Jakobshalle, Basel, Switzerland	Retained European Union cruiserweight title
17	Win	17–0	Pietro Aurino	TKO	2 (12)	16 Dec 2006	BigBox, Kempten, Germany	Won vacant European Union cruiserweight title
16	Win	16–0	Rachid El Hadak	KO	8 (8), 2:24	23 Sep 2006	Rittal Arena, Wetzlar, Germany	
15	Win	15–0	Nuri Seferi	UD	10	3 Jun 2006	TUI Arena, Hanover, Germany	
14	Win	14–0	Lee Swaby	RTD	6 (8), 3:00	4 Mar 2006	EWE Arena, Oldenburg, Germany	
13	Win	13–0	Claudio Rîșco	KO	7 (8), 2:15	28 Jan 2006	Tempodrom, Berlin, Germany	
12	Win	12–0	Michael Simms	UD	8	17 Dec 2005	Max-Schmeling-Halle, Berlin, Germany	
11	Win	11–0	Rüdiger May	UD	10	3 Sep 2005	Internationales Congress Centrum, Berlin, Germany	
10	Win	10–0	Leri Okhanashvili	TKO	2 (8), 2:19	2 Jul 2005	Karl-Eckel-Weg Halle, Hattersheim am Main, Germany	
9	Win	9–0	Tipton Walker	TKO	2 (8), 1:50	11 Jun 2005	BigBox, Kempten, Germany	
8	Win	8–0	Stefan Kusnier	KO	1 (6)	21 May 2005	Hala Sportowa MGOKSiR, Zdzieszowice, Poland	
7	Win	7–0	Muhammed Ali Durmaz	TKO	4 (6)	23 Apr 2005	Westfalenhallen, Dortmund, Germany	
6	Win	6–0	Aleksandrs Borhovs	TKO	4 (6)	12 Mar 2005	Stadthalle, Zwickau, Germany	
5	Win	5–0	Ervin Slonka	TKO	4 (6), 1:23	10 Jan 2005	Boxtempel, Berlin, Germany	
4	Win	4–0	Tomas Mrazek	TKO	3 (6)	18 Dec 2004	Oberfrankenhalle, Bayreuth, Germany	
3	Win	3–0	Wlodek Kopec	TKO	1 (4), 2:26	4 Dec 2004	Estrel Hotel, Berlin, Germany	
2	Win	2–0	Pavel Zima	TKO	1 (4), 1:48	20 Nov 2004	BigBox, Kempten, Germany	
1	Win	1–0	Pavel Cirok	TKO	1 (4)	7 Nov 2004	Rockfabrik, Nuremberg, Germany	

== Titles in boxing ==
=== Major world titles ===
- WBO cruiserweight champion (200 lbs)

=== Minor world titles ===
- IBO cruiserweight champion (200 lbs)

=== Regional/International titles ===
- IBF Inter-Continental cruiserweight champion (200 lbs)
- EBU (EU) cruiserweight champion (200 lbs)
- European cruiserweight champion (200 lbs)

=== Honorary titles ===
- WBO Super Champion

== Viewership ==
=== Germany ===
Date	Fight	Viewership (avg.)	Network	Source(s)
29 December 2007	Steve Cunningham vs. Marco Huck	4,250,000	Das Erste	
18 May 2008	Marco Huck vs. Frantisek Kasanic	2,940,000	Das Erste	
29 August 2009	Victor Emilio Ramírez vs. Marco Huck	4,000,000	Das Erste	
5 December 2009	Marco Huck vs. Ola Afolabi	4,800,000	Das Erste	
13 March 2010	Marco Huck vs. Adam Richards	4,310,000	Das Erste	
1 May 2010	Marco Huck vs. Brian Minto	5,040,000	Das Erste	
21 August 2010	Marco Huck vs. Matt Godfrey	3,800,000	Das Erste	
18 December 2010	Marco Huck vs. Denis Lebedev	4,250,000	Das Erste	
2 April 2011	Marco Huck vs. Ran Nakash	4,500,000	Das Erste	
22 October 2011	Marco Huck vs. Rogelio Omar Rossi	3,610,000	Das Erste	
16 July 2011	Marco Huck vs. Hugo Garay	3,910,000	Das Erste	
25 February 2012	Alexander Povetkin vs. Marco Huck	6,300,000	Das Erste	
5 May 2012	Marco Huck vs. Ola Afolabi II	4,000,000	Das Erste	
3 November 2012	Marco Huck vs. Firat Arslan	3,360,000	Das Erste	
8 June 2013	Marco Huck vs. Ola Afolabi III	3,570,000	Das Erste	
25 January 2014	Marco Huck vs. Firat Arslan II	3,900,000	Das Erste	
26 February 2016	Marco Huck vs. Ola Afolabi IV	4,380,000	RTL Television	
19 November 2016	Marco Huck vs. Dmytro Kucher	3,730,000	RTL Television	
1 April 2017	Mairis Briedis vs. Marco Huck	3,170,000	RTL Television	
9 September 2017	Oleksandr Usyk vs. Marco Huck	1,280,000	Sat.1	
	Total viewership	79,100,000		

Sporting positions
Regional boxing titles
Vacant Title last held by Ismail Abdoul	European Union cruiserweight champion 16 December 2006 – May 2007; Vacated	Vacant Title next held by Giacobbe Fragomeni
Vacant Title last held by Lubos Suda	IBF Inter-Continental cruiserweight champion 17 May 2008 – September 2008; Vacated	Vacant Title next held by Enad Ličina
Preceded by Jean Marc Monrose	European cruiserweight champion 20 September 2008 – August 2009; Vacated	Vacant Title next held by Enzo Maccarinelli
Minor world boxing titles
Preceded by Ola Afolabi	IBO cruiserweight champion 27 February 2016 – 1 April 2017; Vacant after loss to Mairis Briedis	Vacant Title next held by Kevin Lerena
Major world boxing titles
Preceded by Victor Emilio Ramírez	WBO cruiserweight champion 29 August 2009 – 14 August 2015	Succeeded by Krzysztof Głowacki
Awards
Inaugural award	PBC Fight of the Year vs. Krzysztof Głowacki; 2015	Next: Keith Thurman vs. Shawn Porter
Previous: Tommy Coyle vs. Daniel Brizuela; Round 11	ESPN Round of the Year vs. Krzysztof Głowacki; Round 6; 2015	Next: Dillian Whyte vs. Derek Chisora; Round 5
