= Darnell Wilson =

American boxer (born 1974)

Personal information
- Nickname: The Ding-A-Ling Man
- Born: Darnell Wilson; September 22, 1974 (age 51) Cleveland, Ohio, U.S.
- Height: 5 ft 10 in (178 cm)
- Weight: Heavyweight; Cruiserweight

Boxing career
- Reach: 75 in (191 cm)
- Stance: Orthodox

Boxing record
- Total fights: 49
- Wins: 25
- Win by KO: 21
- Losses: 21
- Draws: 3
Medal record
Men's amateur boxing
Representing United States
Pan American Games
Bronze medal – third place	1999 Winnipeg	Light Middleweight
Goodwill Games
Bronze medal – third place	1998 New York	Light Middleweight

Darnell Wilson (born September 22, 1974) is an American former professional boxer who competed from 2000 to 2015. He challenged once for the WBA cruiserweight title in 2008.

== Background ==
Born in Cleveland, Ohio, and raised in Gaithersburg, Maryland, He graduated from Quince Orchard High School in Gaithersburg, Maryland.

== Amateur career ==
Many people confused Darnell Wilson with the outstanding amateur Darnell Wilson who won the United States Amateur Light Middleweight Championship three years in a row (1997–99).

== Professional career ==
Known as "Ding-A-Ling Man", Wilson turned pro in 2000 as a light heavyweight. He showed a world-class punch and a good chin but couldn't outbox his opponents. His best results were draws with George Jones (record 19–2) and James Lubwama (record 18–1).

In 2005 he moved up to cruiserweight. There he was outpointed by prospects/fringe contenders Vadim Tokarev (17–0), Felix Cora Jr. (17–0–2), and veteran Andre Purlette (record 38–2) and also lost to heavyweight Owen Beck.

In late 2006 he at least managed to KO another former light heavyweight in southpaw Daniel Judah (21–1–3), but at age 32 seemed to be going nowhere. He says of this time: "I was diagnosed. My adrenal glands were being worn down. I would go flat after a few rounds of sparring because of a bad effect from energy drinks."

His career direction changed dramatically in 2007 when he scored a sensational KO2 over Canadian contender Dale Brown in Edmonton. He quickly added another upset KO3 over Kelvin Davis who had put him on the deck before in the second round. At this point, Wilson was rated in the Top 10 by The Ring Magazine.

Wilson knocked out hard-punching Emmanuel Nwodo on June 29, 2007. ESPN announcer Teddy Atlas proclaimed it the most devastating knockout ever on ESPN's Friday Night Fights series. It was later named the ESPN.com Knockout of the Year.

He finally got a shot at the WBA cruiserweight title on May 3, 2008, but lost a unanimous decision to Firat Arslan.

Wilson lost his first fight of Season 4 of The Contender to Ehinomen Ehikhamenor.

== Professional boxing record ==
25 Wins (21 knockouts, 4 decisions), 21 Losses (9 knockouts, 12 decision), 3 Draws
Result	Record	Opponent	Type	Round	Date	Location	Notes
Loss	25–21–3	Adrian Granat	KO	2	October 24, 2015	Schulsporthalle, Hamburg, Germany	
Loss	25–20–3	Sergey Kuzmin	TKO	4	August 27, 2015	The Hangar, Costa Mesa, California, U.S.	
Loss	25–19–3	Mike Perez	TKO	2	February 5, 2015	The Hangar, Costa Mesa, California, U.S.	
Loss	25–18–3	Vyacheslav Glazkov	TKO	7	Nov 8, 2014	Boardwalk Hall, Atlantic City, New Jersey, U.S.	
Win	25–17–3	David Rodriguez	KO	6	December 14, 2013	Atlantic City, New Jersey, U.S.	
Loss	24–17–3	Andrey Fedosov	KO	5	April 20, 2013	Hammond, Indiana, U.S.	
Loss	24–16–3	Edmund Gerber	UD	8	November 3, 2012	Halle, Germany	
Loss	24–15–3	Juan Carlos Gómez	TKO	4	April 21, 2012	Schwerin, Germany	
Loss	24–14–3	Denis Boytsov	KO	4	January 28, 2012	Hamburg, Germany	Wilson knocked out at 0:45 of the fourth round.
Loss	24–13–3	Ondřej Pála	UD	12	November 26, 2011	Trabzon, Turkey	For WBO European Heavyweight Title.
Win	24–12–3	Juan Carlos Gomez	MD	10	September 24, 2011	Hamburg, Germany	
Loss	23–12–3	Jason Gavern	TKO	7	April 2, 2011	Jupiter, Florida, U.S.	For WBC CABOFE Heavyweight Title.
Loss	23–11–3	Travis Walker	UD	8	February 26, 2011	Atlanta, Georgia, U.S.	
Loss	23–10–3	Alex Leapai	UD	8	December 4, 2010	Broadbeach, Australia	
Loss	23–9–3	Grigory Drozd	RTD	10	July 2, 2009	Moscow, Russia	For WBO Asia Pacific & PABA Cruiserweight Titles.
Loss	23–8–3	Ehinomen Ehikhamenor	UD	5	January 7, 2009	Singapore	
Loss	23–7–3	Firat Arslan	UD	12	May 3, 2008	Stuttgart, Germany	For WBA Cruiserweight Title.
Win	23–6–3	Robert Marsh	TKO	6	March 15, 2008	Richmond, Virginia, U.S.	
Loss	22–6–3	BJ Flores	UD	12	February 8, 2008	Dover, Delaware, U.S.	For USBA Cruiserweight Title.
Win	22–5–3	Emmanuel Nwodo	KO	11	June 29, 2007	New York City, New York, U.S.	Won USBA Cruiserweight Title.
Win	21–5–3	Kelvin Davis	TKO	3	February 23, 2007	Scranton, Pennsylvania, U.S.	
Win	20–5–3	Dale Brown	TKO	2	January 19, 2007	Edmonton, Alberta, Canada	Won vacant TAB Cruiserweight Title.
Win	19–5–3	Daniel Judah	TKO	4	September 28, 2006	Glen Burnie, Maryland, U.S.	
Loss	18–5–3	Andre Purlette	UD	6	June 30, 2006	Hollywood, Florida, U.S.	
Loss	18–4–3	Felix Cora, Jr.	UD	10	March 24, 2006	Hollywood, Florida, U.S.	For NABF Cruiserweight Title.
Loss	18–3–3	Owen Beck	UD	8	7 Jan 2006	New York City, New York, U.S.	
Loss	18–2–3	Vadim Tokarev	UD	10	August 18, 2005	Kazan, Russia	
Win	18–1–3	Rodney Moore	UD	8	May 5, 2005	Glen Burnie, Maryland, U.S.	
Win	17–1–3	John Ivan Battle	TKO	4	April 1, 2005	Warren, Michigan, U.S.	
Draw	16–1–3	George Khalid Jones	PTS	10	August 3, 2004	Glen Burnie, Maryland, U.S.	
Draw	16–1–2	James Lubwama	PTS	12	May 20, 2004	Sault Sainte Marie, Michigan, U.S.	For vacant IBA Americas Cruiserweight Title.
Win	16–1–1	Forrest Neal	KO	3	March 27, 2004	Washington, D.C., U.S.	
Win	15–1–1	Anton Robinson	TKO	3	December 9, 2003	Pikesville, Maryland, U.S.	
Win	14–1–1	Darren Whitley	UD	8	September 26, 2003	Washington, D.C., U.S.	
Win	13–1–1	Rodney Moore	TKO	3	June 27, 2003	Atlantic City, New Jersey, U.S.	
Win	12–1–1	Charles Rasheed Lee	KO	1	May 8, 2003	Glen Burnie, Maryland, U.S.	
Win	11–1–1	Darren Whitley	UD	6	April 8, 2003	Baltimore, Maryland, U.S.	
Win	10–1–1	Dana Rucker	TKO	8	November 14, 2002	Glen Burnie, Maryland, U.S.	Won vacant Maryland Light Heavyweight Title.
Win	9–1–1	Eric Starr	KO	1	September 26, 2002	Glen Burnie, Maryland, U.S.	
Win	8–1–1	Dennis McKinney	TKO	3	June 20, 2002	Glen Burnie, Maryland, U.S.	
Win	7–1–1	Iman Green	TKO	4	May 9, 2002	Glen Burnie, Maryland, U.S.	
Win	6–1–1	Eric Starr	TKO	6	March 21, 2002	Glen Burnie, Maryland, U.S.	
Win	5–1–1	Sam Reese	KO	3	February 28, 2002	Baltimore, Maryland, U.S.	
Win	4–1–1	Will Little	KO	2	January 17, 2002	Glen Burnie, Maryland, U.S.	
Win	3–1–1	William Bailey	KO	2	November 15, 2001	Glen Burnie, Maryland, U.S.	
Win	2–1–1	Lonnie Kornegay	TKO	2	September 27, 2001	Glen Burnie, Maryland, U.S.	
Loss	1–1–1	Damien Rice	UD	4	June 16, 2001	New York City, New York, U.S.	
Draw	1–0–1	Willis Lockett	PTS	4	May 10, 2001	Glen Burnie, Maryland, U.S.	
Win	1–0	Rodney Dews	KO	1	November 16, 2000	Glen Burnie, Maryland, U.S.	

== Life outside the ring ==
Darnell Wilson owns and operates a digital infrastructure firm as a technology systems engineer.
