= Ola Afolabi =

English boxer (born 1980)

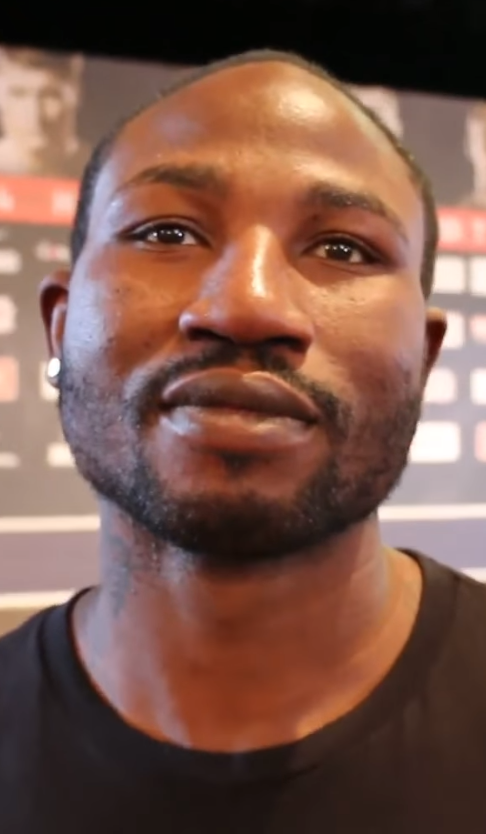
- Afolabi in 2015

Personal information
- Nickname: Kryptonite
- Born: Olawale O. Afolabi; 15 March 1980 (age 46) London, England
- Height: 6 ft 3 in (191 cm)
- Weight: Super middleweight Light heavyweight Cruiserweight

Boxing career
- Reach: 75 1/2 in (192 cm)
- Stance: Orthodox

Boxing record
- Total fights: 32
- Wins: 22
- Win by KO: 11
- Losses: 6
- Draws: 4

Olawale O. "Ola" Afolabi (born 15 March 1980) is an English former professional boxer. He is a two-time former WBO interim cruiserweight world champion, as well as a two-time former IBO cruiserweight champion.

== Career ==
Afolabi began his professional career in 2002. On 14 March 2009, he defeated Enzo Maccarinelli to win the WBO interim cruiserweight world title at the M.E.N. Arena in Manchester, England.

He lost by unanimous decision against full WBO cruiserweight champion Marco Huck at Arena Ludwigsburg in Ludwigsburg, Germany on 5 December 2009.

Afolabi secured a first round knockout over former European champion Terry Dunstan at Imtech Arena, Altona, Hamburg, Germany, on 2 July 2011.

On 3 March 2012, Afolabi became a two-time WBO interim cruiserweight champion when his opponent, Valery Brudov, retired at the end of the fifth round of their fight at Esprit Arena in Düsseldorf, Germany.

He got a rematch against Marco Huck on 5 May 2012, for Huck's WBO Cruiserweight championship. The fight at Messehalle in Erfurt, Germany ended in a majority draw.

Afolabi and Huck met for a third time at Max-Schmeling-Halle, Prenzlauer Berg in Berlin, Germany, on 8 June 2013. Afolabi lost by majority decision.

He defeated Łukasz Janik by majority decision to win the vacant IBO cruiserweight title at The Theater at Madison Square Garden in New York, USA, on 2 November 2013.

Afolabi fought Victor Emilio Ramírez for the vacant IBF interim cruiserweight title at Villa La Ñata Sporting Club, Benavídez in Buenos Aires, Argentina on 10 April 2015, losing via unanimous decision.

On 4 November 2015, he defeated defending champion Rakhim Chakhkiyev by fifth round knockout to win the IBO cruiserweight title at TatNeft Arena in Kazan, Russia.

His first title defense was a fourth fight with Marco Huck, at Gerry Weber Stadion in Halle, Germany, on 27 February 2016, which he lost when he retired on his stool at the end of the 10th round.

On his 36th birthday, 15 March 2016, Afolabi announced his retirement from professional boxing.

However, he made a comeback 14 months later to face Mario Daser for the once again vacant IBO cruiserweight title at Barclaycard Arena in Hamburg, Germany, on 19 May 2017. Afolabi was knocked out in the third round.

== Professional boxing record ==
22 Wins (11 knockouts, 11 decisions), 6 Losses, 4 Draws
Result	Record	Opponent	Type	Rd., Time	Date	Location	Notes
Loss	22–6–4	(Germany) Mario Daser	TKO	3 (12), 2:00	2017-05-19	(Germany) Barclaycard Arena, Hamburg	
Loss	22–5–4	(Germany) Marco Huck	RTD	10 (12), 3:00	2016-02-27	(Germany) Gerry Weber Stadion, Halle, Nordrhein-Westfalen	Lost IBO Cruiserweight title.
Win	22–4–4	(Russia) Rakhim Chakhkiyev	KO	5 (12), 1:44	2015-11-04	(Russia) TatNeft Arena, Kazan	Won IBO Cruiserweight title. IBF Cruiserweight title eliminator.
Loss	21–4–4	(Argentina) Victor Emilio Ramírez	UD	12	2015-04-10	(Argentina) Villa La Ñata Sporting Club, Benavídez, Buenos Aires	For interim IBF Cruiserweight title.
Win	21–3–4	(United States) Anthony Caputo Smith	RTD	3 (12), 3:00	2014-07-26	(United States) Madison Square Garden, New York City	
Win	20–3–4	(Poland) Łukasz Janik	MD	12	2013-11-02	(United States) The Theater at Madison Square Garden, New York City	Won vacant IBO Cruiserweight title.
Loss	19–3–4	(Germany) Marco Huck	MD	12	2013-06-08	(Germany) Max-Schmeling-Halle, Prenzlauer Berg, Berlin	For WBO Cruiserweight title.
Draw	19–2–4	(Germany) Marco Huck	MD	12	2012-05-05	(Germany) Messehalle, Erfurt, Thuringia	For WBO Cruiserweight title.
Win	19–2–3	(Russia) Valery Brudov	RTD	5 (12), 3:00	3 Mar 2012	(Germany) Esprit Arena, Düsseldorf, Nordrhein-Westfalen	Won interim WBO Cruiserweight title.
Win	18–2–3	(Poland) Lukasz Rusiewicz	UD	8	2011-09-10	(Poland) Stadion Miejski, Wrocław	
Win	17–2–3	(United Kingdom) Terry Dunstan	KO	1 (12), 2:40	2011-07-02	(Germany) Imtech Arena, Altona, Hamburg	Retained WBO Inter-Continental Cruiserweight title.
Win	16–2–3	(Czech Republic) Lubos Suda	TKO	5 (12)	2011-03-19	(Germany) Lanxess Arena, Cologne, Nordrhein-Westfalen	Won vacant WBO Inter-Continental Cruiserweight title.
Win	15–2–3	(Georgia (country)) Sandro Siproshvili	UD	10	16 Oct 2010	(Germany) O2 World Arena, Altona, Hamburg	
Loss	14–2–3	(Germany) Marco Huck	UD	12	2009-12-05	(Germany) Arena Ludwigsburg, Ludwigsburg, Baden-Württemberg	For WBO Cruiserweight title.
Win	14–1–3	(United Kingdom) Enzo Maccarinelli	KO	9 (12), 1:50	2009-03-14	(United Kingdom) M.E.N. Arena, Manchester, Greater Manchester	Won interim WBO Cruiserweight title.
Win	13–1–3	(United States) DeLeon Tinsley	UD	8	2008-08-15	(United States) Ibiza Nightclub, Washington, D.C.	
Win	12–1–3	(United States) Eric Fields	TKO	10 (10), 0:55	2008-04-12	(United States) Emerald Queen Casino, Tacoma Washington	Won vacant WBO NABO Cruiserweight title.
Win	11–1–3	(United States) Orlin Norris	TKO	7 (8), 2:31	2005-11-03	(United States) 4th and B, San Diego, California	
Win	10–1–3	(United States) Michael Simms	UD	8	2005-08-19	(United States) Gold Coast Hotel and Casino, Las Vegas, Nevada	
Win	9–1–3	(United States) James Walton	UD	4	2005-05-27	(United States) Gold Coast Hotel and Casino, Las Vegas, Nevada	
Draw	8–1–3	(United States) Jonathan Young	PTS	6	2005-01-14	(United States) Agua Caliente Casino Resort Spa, Rancho Mirage, California	
Win	8–1–2	(United States) Willie Chapman	TKO	2 (6), 0:54	2004-11-05	(United States) Gold Coast Hotel and Casino, Las Vegas, Nevada	
Win	7–1–2	(United States) Carlos Raul Ibarra	UD	4	2004-08-37	(United States) The Orleans, Las Vegas, Nevada	
Win	6–1–2	(United States) Man Semou Diouf	KO	5 (6), 0:57	2004-07-09	(United States) Gold Coast Hotel and Casino, Las Vegas, Nevada	
Win	5–1–2	(Mexico) Gustavo Arroyo	TKO	2 (4), 1:44	2004-04-23	(United States) The Orleans, Las Vegas, Nevada	
Win	4–1–2	(United States) Germain Thedford	UD	4	2004-02-13	(United States) Fort Cheyenne Casino, Las Vegas, Nevada	
Draw	3–1–2	(Canada) Anthony Russell	PTS	4	2003-09-05	(United States) Stardust Hotel & Casino, Las Vegas, Nevada	
Win	3–1–1	(Mexico) Alejandro Rafael Virgen	UD	4	2003-04-11	(United States) Radisson Hotel, Fresno, California	
Loss	2–1–1	(United States) Allan Green	UD	4	2003-03-08	(United States) Marconi Automotive Museum, Tustin, California	
Win	2–0–1	(United States) Joe Mendoza	UD	4	2003-02-07	(United States) Radisson Hotel, Fresno, California	
Win	1–0–1	(United States) Tom Perea	UD	4	2002-07-11	(United States) SAP Center at San Jose, San Jose, California	
Draw	0–0–1	(United States) Gerard Barber	PTS	4	2002-02-14	(United States) Marriott Hotel, Irvine, California	Professional debut.

Sporting positions
Vacant Title last held by Victor Emilio Ramirez	WBO cruiserweight champion Interim title 14 March 2009 – 5 December 2009; Lost bid for full title	Vacant Title next held by Himself
Vacant Title last held by Himself	WBO cruiserweight champion Interim title 3 March 2012 – 8 June 2013; Lost bid for full title	Vacant Title next held by Krzysztof Głowacki
Vacant Title last held by Danny Green	IBO cruiserweight champion 2 November 2013 – 2015	Vacant Title next held by Rakhim Chakhkiyev
Preceded by Rakhim Chakhkiyev	IBO cruiserweight champion 4 November 2015 – 27 February 2016	Succeeded by Marco Huck
