= Emmanuel Nwodo =

Nigerian boxer

Personal information
- Nickname: Real Steel
- Nationality: Nigerian
- Born: Emmanuel John Chukuwuemeka Nwodo; 19 March 1974 (age 52) Enugu, Nigeria
- Weight: cruiserweight

Boxing career
- Stance: orthodox

Boxing record
- Total fights: 26
- Wins: 23
- Win by KO: 19
- Losses: 5
- Draws: 0
- No contests: 0

Emmanuel John Chukuwuemeka Nwodo //, known more commonly as Emmanuel Nwodo (born 19 March 1974) is a Nigerian professional boxer who fights in the cruiserweight division.

== Professional boxing record ==
23 Wins (19 knockouts, 4 decisions), 5 Losses (4 knockouts, 1 decision)
Result	Record	Opponent	Type	Round	Date	Location	Notes
Win	14-32-3	Lenzie Morgan	TKO	1	29/08/2009	City Armory, Lynchburg, Virginia, U.S.	
Loss	16-1	Matt Godfrey	TKO	4	29/08/2008	Mohegan Sun Casino, Uncasville, Connecticut, U.S.	NABF Cruiserweight Title. Referee stopped the bout at 1:57 of the fourth round.
Win	29-7	Ezra Sellers	KO	2	19/01/2008	Madison Square Garden, New York City, U.S.	Sellers knocked out at 2:59 of the second round.
Loss	21-5-3	Darnell Wilson	KO	11	29/06/2007	St. George Theatre, Staten Island, New York, U.S.	IBF USBA Cruiserweight Title. Nwodo knocked out at 2:00 of the 11th round.
Win	16-4-2	Chris Thomas	TKO	3	01/07/2006	ABC Sports Complex, Springfield, Virginia, U.S.	IBF USBA Cruiserweight Title. Referee stopped the bout at 2:30 of the third round.
Win	6-26	Ron Krull	TKO	1	29/04/2006	ABC Sports Complex, Springfield, Virginia, U.S.	
Win	6-10-3	John Douglas	TKO	4	02/12/2005	The Blue Horizon, Philadelphia, U.S.	Referee stopped the bout at 1:35 of the fourth round.
Win	14-5-1	Rayco Saunders	UD	8	24/06/2005	The Blue Horizon, Philadelphia, U.S.	
Win	6-15-4	Hilario Guzman	TKO	7	18/02/2005	The Blue Horizon, Philadelphia, U.S.	Referee stopped the bout at 1:22 of the seventh round.
Win	24-5-2	Imamu Mayfield	TKO	1	03/12/2004	The Blue Horizon, Philadelphia, U.S.	Referee stopped the bout at 1:24 of the first round.
Win	9-0	Frank Walker	KO	1	08/10/2004	The Blue Horizon, Philadelphia, U.S.	Walker knocked out at 1:09 of the first round.
Win	10-2-2	Willie Herring	TKO	4	30/09/2004	Michael's Eighth Avenue, Glen Burnie, Maryland, U.S.	Referee stopped the bout at 3:00 of the fourth round.
Win	4-2	Newton Kidd	UD	6	10/09/2004	The Blue Horizon, Philadelphia, U.S.	
Win	7-2	Tyrone Tate	KO	2	31/08/2004	Pennsylvania Convention Center, Philadelphia, U.S.	Tate knocked out at 2:49 of the second round.
Loss	8-0	Richel Hersisia	TKO	3	18/01/2002	Thyhallen, Thisted, Denmark	
Win	2-0	Anthony Musonye	KO	1	04/08/2001	Nairobi, Kenya	
Loss	--	Peter Odhiambo	PTS	6	30/07/2000	Nairobi, Kenya	
Win	0-1	Ahmed Salim	KO	4	16/04/2000	Kenya	
Win	1-3-1	Tom Okusi	PTS	8	05/11/1999	Kenya	
Loss	8-1-1	Joseph Akhasamba	TKO	5	26/09/1999	Nairobi, Kenya	African heavyweight title.
		John Martin Cyril	TKO	1	09/07/1999	Enugu, Nigeria	
Win	0-5	Paul Otewa	KO	6	28/08/1999	Kenya	
Win	1-2-1	Tom Okusi	KO	2	10/04/1999	Kenya	
		Joe John	TKO	2	03/03/1999	Kenya	
Win	0-1	Bob Harrison	KO	1	01/01/1999	Nairobi City Stadium, Nairobi, Kenya	
Win	0-4	Paul Otewa	KO	6	28/08/1998	Kenya	
Win	12-7-1	Joe John	KO	4	05/06/1998	Kenya	
Win	0-1	James Omondi	PTS	4	07/03/1998	Kenya	
