= Dmytro Kucher =

Ukrainian boxer (born 1984)

Dmytro Kucher Дмитро Кучер
Personal information
- Nationality: Ukrainian
- Born: Dmytro Kucher; 25 August 1984 (age 42) Vinnytsia, Ukraine
- Height: 188 cm (6 ft 2 in)
- Weight: Cruiserweight

Boxing career
- Stance: Orthodox

Boxing record
- Total fights: 28
- Wins: 24
- Win by KO: 18
- Losses: 3
- Draws: 1

Dmytro Kucher (born 25 August 1984) is a Ukrainian former professional boxer who competed from 2009 to 2018. He held the European cruiserweight title in 2016.

== Professional career ==
=== Kucher vs. Maccarinelli ===
On 10 June 2016, Kucher stopped Enzo Maccarinelli via first-round technical knockout (TKO) to win the vacant European cruiserweight title.

=== Kucher vs. Huck ===
Kucher lost to Marco Huck via unanimous decision in their 12 round contest on 19 November 2016. The scorecards read 117–111, 119–109 and 117–111 in favor of Huck.

=== Kucher vs. Lerena ===
On 3 March 2018, Kucher fought Kevin Lerena, ranked #4 by the IBF, #6 by the WBC and #9 by the WBA at cruiserweight. Kucher won the fight via unanimous decision.

== Professional boxing record ==
28 fights	24 wins	3 losses
By knockout	18	0
By decision	6	3
Draws	1	

No.	Result	Record	Opponent	Type	Round, time	Date	Location	Notes
28	Loss	24–3–1	(South Africa) Kevin Lerena	UD	12	3 Mar 2018	Emperors Palace, Kempton Park, South Africa	For IBO cruiserweight title
27	Loss	24–2–1	(Germany) Marco Huck	UD	12	19 Nov 2016	TUI Arena, Hanover, Germany	For IBO cruiserweight title
26	Win	24–1–1	(United Kingdom) Enzo Maccarinelli	TKO	1 (12), 2:48	10 Jun 2016	(United Kingdom) York Hall, London, England	Won vacant European cruiserweight title
25	Draw	23–1–1	(Belgium) Bilal Laggoune	SD	12	09 Oct 2015	Topsporthal Vlaanderen, Ghent, Belgium	For vacant European cruiserweight title
24	Win	23–1	(United States) Bobby Thomas Jr	RTD	1 (8), 3:00	30 May 2015	(United States) Florentine Gardens, California, USA	
23	Win	22–1	(United States) Galen Brown	RTD	4 (8), 3:00	24 Oct 2014	(United States) Crowne Hotel, San Diego, California, USA	
22	Loss	21–1	(Democratic Republic of the Congo) Ilunga Makabu	MD	12	13 Jul 2013	Salle des Étoiles, Monte Carlo, Monaco	For vacant WBC Silver cruiserweight title
21	Win	21–0	(Brazil) Julio Cesar Dos Santos	UD	12	21 Mar 2013	Club Sportlife, Kyiv, Ukraine	Won vacant WBC International cruiserweight title
20	Win	20–0	(United States) Willie Herring	UD	8	22 Dec 2012	(United States) Hollywood Park, Inglewood, California, US	
19	Win	19–0	(France) Steve Herelius	KO	2 (12), 1:30	27 Oct 2012	Club Sportlife, Kyiv, Ukraine	Retained WBC International Silver cruiserweight title
18	Win	18–0	(Belgium) Geoffrey Battelo	TKO	5 (10), 2:01	19 Aug 2012	Club Sportlife, Kyiv, Ukraine	
17	Win	17–0	(Argentina) Cesar David Crenz	KO	3 (12), 1:17	27 Jun 2012	Club Sportlife, Kyiv, Ukraine	For vacant WBC International Silver cruiserweight title
16	Win	16–0	(Argentina) Walter David Cabral	KO	2 (10)	27 Apr 2012	Club Sportlife, Kyiv, Ukraine	
15	Win	15–0	(Czech Republic) Lubos Suda	RTD	8 (10), 3:00	26 Feb 2012	Club Sportlife, Kyiv, Ukraine	
14	Win	14–0	(Belgium) Ismail Abdoul	UD	8	18 Dec 2011	Sport Palace Yunist, Zaporizhia, Ukraine	
13	Win	13–0	(Georgia (country)) Sandro Siproshvili	UD	8	03 Oct 2011	Sports Complex "Freestyle", Kyiv, Ukraine	
12	Win	12–0	(Azerbaijan) Ali Ismailov	RTD	7 (8), 3:00	11 Jun 2011	Sport Palace, Kyiv, Ukraine	
11	Win	11–0	(Norway) Kim Johnny Jenssen	TKO	3 (8)	19 Nov 2010	Sports Complex "Freestyle", Kyiv, Ukraine	
10	Win	10–0	(Uganda) Joey Vegas	UD	8	28 Aug 2010	Independence Square, Kyiv, Ukraine	
9	Win	9–0	(Uzbekistan) Mikhail Nasyrov	RTD	6 (8), 3:00	21 May 2010	Sports Complex "Freestyle", Kyiv, Ukraine	
8	Win	8–0	(Moldova) Ion Gaivan	TKO	5 (6), 1:28	13 Mar 2010	Podmoskovye Hall, Podolsk, Russia	
7	Win	7–0	(Georgia (country)) Teymuraz Kekelidze	KO	2 (8), 0:44	06 Feb 2010	Sports Complex "Freestyle", Kyiv, Ukraine	
6	Win	6–0	(Ukraine) Vasyl Kondor	RTD	4 (8), 3:00	28 Nov 2009	Elite Boxing Gym, Kyiv, Ukraine	
5	Win	5–0	(Ukraine) Kostiantyn Okhrei	KO	2 (6), 1:12	17 Sep 2009	Sportpalace Meteor, Dnipropetrovsk, Ukraine	
4	Win	4–0	(Ukraine) Yuriy Horbenko	UD	6	15 Sep 2009	Borschagovka Gym, Kyiv, Ukraine	
3	Win	3–0	(Ukraine) Maksym Stasiuk	TKO	1 (4)	13 Jun 2009	Sport Hall, Kyiv, Ukraine	
2	Win	2–0	(Russia) Sergey Pronin	TKO	3 (4)	25 Apr 2009	Borschagovka Gym, Kyiv, Ukraine	
1	Win	1–0	(Ukraine) Yuriy Bilinchuk	TKO	4 (4)	14 Mar 2009	Sport Hall, Kyiv, Ukraine	debut
