= Matt Godfrey (angler) =

Matthew Godfrey (born 1991) is an English angler hailing from Kiveton, near Sheffield, and a three time World Junior Champion of the sport.

== Biography ==
Matt is a regular feature in the international set up and is the only person to have won the junior world title three times.

Matt began fishing at the age of just three years old, when he used to go and visit his grandparents who owned a caravan at Torksey in Lincolnshire. With the Fossdyke just a short walk from the site, it didn’t take Matt long to persuade his dad, Kevin to let him give fishing a try at the age of 3.

With most of his early years spent fishing venues around this area such as the Fossdyke, the Till and the Trent, it is not surprising that Matt has developed such an affinity to natural venues.

It was at a commercial that he was given his big break into team fishing however, when he met Glyn Williams at an open day at Shireoaks when he was eight years old. The Worksop coach took Matt under his wing, signing him up for the Worksop cadet team.

He fished his first national with the cadets aged 10 on the Bargate drain near Boston, helping the team to gold, and taking the individual bronze medal for himself.

Aged 12, he made it into cadet team yet again for the national on the River Nene in Peterborough, where he took both individual and team gold, cementing his place as one of the best up and coming anglers in the country.

The year after, the team struggled in the national, but in 2005, when Matt was 14, they bounced back yet again, taking team gold at Droitwich complex Woodlands View. This was also the year that Matt was first selected to represent his country in Serbia. The England teams did brilliantly this year, with both the juniors and intermediates taking team gold, with Matt taking the individual gold, and the intermediates also returning with an individual silver medal.

Following on from his success the year before, Matt was selected to captain the junior squad in 2006. The team took a bronze medal, with Matt finishing a respectable thirteenth individually on the Bridgewater canal

In 2007, Matt went on to secure his much documented second world title, taking the individual gold medal in the Czech republic. Other than his major success on the international stage, this year also saw Matt sign for Triana North.

In 2009, Matt finished second in the prestigious Angling Times Maver Pairs Final with Tom Scholey, and was snapped up by top northern match fishing team, Ultimate Barnsley Blacks, where he now fishes alongside some of the country's best anglers, including five times World Champion, Alan Scotthorne,

In 2010, Godfrey won the Individual Silver medal in his first ever U22 World Championship, at the age of just 18.

He has since completed a Geography degree at Sheffield University, and now works as Editorial Assistant on Pole Fishing Magazine, at David Hall Publishing.

Notable recent achievements include a 3rd-place finish in the 2013 Bait Tech Festival at White Acres, and victory in the Parkdean Pairs Festival with Tom Scholey.

On the other hand, he works on social media with Tackle Guru, on YouTube, TikTok, and other social medias, having near millions of followers.
