= Shaun George (boxer) =

American boxer (born 1979)

Personal information
- Nationality: American
- Born: Shauna Rackeem George; March 20, 1979 (age 47) Brooklyn, New York, U.S.
- Height: 6 ft 0 in (183 cm)
- Weight: Light Heavyweight

Boxing career
- Reach: 82 in (208 cm)
- Stance: Orthodox

Boxing record
- Total fights: 23
- Wins: 18
- Win by KO: 9
- Losses: 3
- Draws: 2

Shaun George (born March 20, 1979) is an American professional boxer. He is best known for sensationally upsetting former heavyweight champ Chris Byrd which all but ended Byrd's career. George is the nephew of former world title challenger and trainer Lennox Blackmoore. He studied paralegal studies at Northern Michigan University.

== Amateur ==
As an amateur, George accumulated a record of 51-7. In 1993 and 1995 George won Junior Olympic titles. George won 1996 and 1997 New York Golden Gloves titles in the 178-pound division but lost his first fight at the National Golden Gloves. During his amateur career George defeated current-IBF cruiserweight champion Steve Cunningham (x2) and 2004 US Olympian Devin Vargas.

== Pro ==
George turned professional in 2000 and boxed at both light-heavy and Cruiserweight. He sat out 2001 with shoulder problems to his right arm that needed to be operated on twice. He remained unbeaten for five years (11 wins, 2 draws), racking up wins over Cruiser Chad Van Sickle (record 20-1) and Jermell Barnes before losing his first fight to undefeated amateur star Matt Godfrey in May 2006 by TKO1. In February 2007 George fought comebacking former European champion Alexander Gurov in Gurov's Ukrainian hometown, with Gurov winning a controversial twelve-round decision.

George then moved down to light-heavyweight and beat former light-heavyweight title challenger Richard Hall by unanimous decision.

When former two-time heavyweight champion Chris Byrd dropped down two weightclasses to compete at light-heavyweight he chose George as his first fight. George scored a knockdown in the first round and then followed up with two more in the ninth round to score a TKO in the 9th. This all but retired Byrd and is certainly the signature win for George in the pro ranks. He added a KO1 over shopworn 40-year-old veteran Jaffa Ballogou (46-7) to keep his title hopes at 175 lbs alive but a KO6 to fringe contender Chris Henry (23-2) in 2009 was a big setback for the now 30-year-old George.

He is trained by Tommy Brooks, promoted by Lou DiBella and advised by Donna Brooks. His public relations are handled by Boxing Buzz Media.

== Professional boxing record ==
18 Wins (9 knockouts, 9 decisions), 3 Losses (2 knockouts, 1 decision), 2 Draws
Result	Record	Opponent	Type	Round	Date	Location	Notes
Loss	23-2	(United States) Chris Henry	TKO	6	10/07/2009	(United States) Asylum Arena, Philadelphia, Pennsylvania	Referee stopped the bout at 1:08 of the sixth round.
Win	46-7	(Togo) Jaffa Ballogou	TKO	1	25/02/2009	(United States) BB King's Blues Club & Grill, New York City	Referee stopped the bout at 1:26 of the first round.
Win	40-4-1	(United States) Chris Byrd	TKO	9	16/05/2008	(United States) Thomas & Mack Center, Las Vegas, Nevada	Referee stopped the bout at 2:42 of the ninth round.
Win	35-19-1	(United States) Thomas Reid	UD	10	06/12/2007	(United States) Robert Treat Center, Newark, New Jersey	
Win	25-16	(United States) Matthew Charleston	RTD	4	09/08/2007	(United States) Coeur d'Alene Casino, Worley, Idaho	Charleston retired at the end of the fourth round.
Win	27-6	(Jamaica) Richard Hall	UD	8	18/05/2007	(United States) Million Dollar Elm Casino, Tulsa, Oklahoma	
Loss	38-5-1	(Ukraine) Alexander Gurov	UD	12	23/02/2007	(Russia) DIVS, Ekaterinburg	WBO Asia Pacific Cruiserweight Title.
Win	5-8-1	(United States) Roosevelt Johnson	KO	1	14/12/2006	(United States) Grand Ballroom, New York City	Johnson knocked out at 2:41 of the first round.
Win	6-11-3	(Guyana) John Douglas	UD	8	15/09/2006	(United States) JFK High School, Paterson, New Jersey	
Loss	11-0	(United States) Matt Godfrey	TKO	1	10/05/2006	(United States) Foxwoods, Mashantucket, Connecticut	WBA NABA/WBC USNBC Cruiserweight Titles. Referee stopped the bout at 2:21 of the first round.
Win	20-1-2	(United States) Chad Van Sickle	UD	10	11/11/2005	(United States) Washington, D.C.	WBA NABA/IBC Americas Cruiserweight Titles.
Draw	11-3-2	(United States) Willie Herring	SD	10	21/06/2005	(United States) A La Carte Event Pavilion, Tampa, Florida	
Win	17-7	(United States) Jermell Barnes	UD	10	28/01/2005	(United States) The Tropicana, Atlantic City, New Jersey	IBC Americas Cruiserweight Title.
Win	12-4-2	(United States) Dhafir Smith	UD	6	26/03/2004	(United States) Miccosukee Resort and Gaming, Miami, Florida	
Win	2-2-1	(United States) Deandre McCole	UD	6	29/01/2004	(United States) Gotham Hall, New York City	
Win	1-0	(United States) Terrance Smith	TKO	2	21/02/2003	(United States) The Aladdin, Las Vegas, Nevada	Referee stopped the bout at 2:06 of the second round.
Win	2-1	(United States) Steve Hemphill	UD	6	24/11/2002	(United States) Sports Plus Events Centre, Lake Grove, New York	
Win	3-14	(United States) Johnny Walker	TKO	1	11/10/2002	(United States) Freeman Coliseum, San Antonio, Texas	Referee stopped the bout at 0:37 of the first round.
Win	0-1	(United States) Isaac Broussard	UD	4	19/04/2002	(United States) Rosedale Park, San Antonio, Texas	
Win	1-5	(United States) Shinny Burns	TKO	2	18/11/2000	(United States) West Craven High School, Vanceboro, North Carolina	
Win	2-0	(Czech Republic) Robert Sulgan	TKO	2	02/09/2000	(United States) Pamlico High School, Bayboro, North Carolina	Referee stopped the bout at 1:54 of the second round.
Draw	1-1	(Jamaica) Andrew Hutchinson	PTS	4	27/07/2000	(United States) Hammerstein Ballroom, New York City	
Win	--	Kenneth Pinckney	TKO	1	08/07/2000	(United States) Pamlico High School, Bayboro, North Carolina	
