= Matt Godfrey =

American boxer (born 1981)

Personal information
- Nickname: Too Smooth
- Nationality: American
- Born: January 16, 1981 (age 45) Providence, Rhode Island, U.S.
- Weight: Cruiserweight

Boxing career
- Stance: Orthodox stance

Boxing record
- Total fights: 24
- Wins: 21
- Win by KO: 11
- Losses: 3
- Draws: 0
- No contests: 0

Matt Godfrey (born January 16, 1981) is a Wampanoag former professional boxer who competed from 2004 to 2012. He challenged for the WBO cruiserweight title in 2010.

== Amateur career ==
Godfrey, who is a close friend of Jason Estrada since his childhood, had an outstanding amateur career prior to turning professional.

He was the 2000 U.S. National Amateur Champion at Middleweight, 2002 National Golden Gloves Heavyweight Champion, and 2004 U.S. National Amateur Heavyweight Champion.

With a relaxed stick-and-move style but only average power he won a bronze medal at the 2001 Pan Am Games.

He was also a second alternate for the 2004 U.S. Olympic Team after losing 8-17 to Devin Vargas (whom Godfrey had beaten before on another occasion). He lost three times to Aaron Williams; on the other hand, he holds three wins over Chazz Witherspoon.

He compiled a 194-23 amateur record.

=== Amateur highlights ===
- 2000 U.S. National Amateur Champion Middleweight (165 lbs)
- 2001 Bronze Medalist in Pan-American Games
- 2002 National Golden Gloves Heavyweight Champion
- 2004 U.S. National Amateur Heavyweight Champion
- Second alternate for 2004 U.S. Olympic Team
- 6-time New England Golden Gloves Champion

== Professional career ==
Godfrey, who is now trained by Dr. Roland Estrada and Ross Enamait, turned professional in 2004. He made his professional debut at the Convention Center in Providence, Rhode Island, in May 2004.

After defeating two veterans in the summer of 2005, Godfrey beat Billy Willis by decision at the Convention Center in Providence and improved to 10-0. Godfrey stopped Ernest M-16 Mateen in the second round in February 2006.

Godfrey's next fight was the turning point in his career. He was matched up against amateur star Shaun George (also 11-0) in May 2006. George never had a chance, getting pummeled and knocked out in the first round.

In April 2007 Godfrey was pitted against star of the Contender Series Felix Cora Jr. in the Main Event of the evening. In a fight that commentators noted was probably his first real test against a left-hander, Godfrey turned southpaw himself for two rounds to effectively outscore Cora, before knocking him down midway through the second round. Cora regained his feet, but did not provide any offense and the referee waved the fight off shortly thereafter.

Four months later Godfrey defeated Derrick Brown by decision which earned him a world title eliminator against Czech amateur star Rudolf Kraj. Godfrey was 16-0 while Kraj was 13-0. The fight took place in Kraj's adopted home country of Germany, and Kraj won on points.

Nearly six months later one of Godfrey's most exciting fights took place at Mohegan Sun in Connecticut. He fought Emmanuel Nwodo, who proved to be a tough fight for Godfrey, but in the end Godfrey knocked him out in the 4th round.

Godfrey earned his 18th win against Edward Gutierrez in November 2008, pitched a shutout against undefeated Shawn Hawk (18-0) and improved to 20-1 with 10 KOs with a split decision win over veteran Michael Simms. The win earned Godfrey a shot at Marco Huck's WBO title, which he lost by KO5. He lost again to the undefeated Lateef Kayode on points.

Sporting positions
Preceded by Devin Vargas	United States Amateur Heavyweight Champion; 2004	Succeeded by Tony Grano

== Professional boxing record ==
21 wins (11 knockouts, 10 decisions), 3 losses (1 knockout, 2 decisions)
Result	Record	Opponent	Type	Round	Date	Location	Notes
Win	10-3	(United States) Jesse Oltmanns	TKO	5 (6), 0:10	19/07/2012	(United States) Twin River Casino, Lincoln, Rhode Island, U.S.	
Loss	16-0	(Nigeria) Lateef Kayode	UD	10	10/06/2011	(United States) Chumash Casino, Santa Ynez, California, U.S.	For WBC–NABF and vacant WBA–NABA cruiserweight titles
Loss	29-1	(Germany) Marco Huck	TKO	5 (12), 2:18	21/08/2010	Messehalle, Erfurt, Germany	For WBO cruiserweight title
Win	20-11-2	(United States) Michael Simms	SD	10	12/09/2009	(United States) Red Lion Hotels, Sacramento, California, U.S.	
Win	18-0-1	(United States) Shawn Hawk	UD	10	10/07/2009	(United States) Asylum Arena, Philadelphia, Pennsylvania, U.S.	Retained WBC–NABF cruiserweight title
Win	15-5-1	(United States) Edward Gutierrez	UD	10	22/11/2008	(United States) 4 Bears Casino & Lodge, New Town, North Dakota, U.S.	Won inaugural SNBC cruiserweight title
Win	22-4	(Nigeria) Emmanuel Nwodo	TKO	4 (10), 1:57	29/08/2008	(United States) Mohegan Sun, Uncasville, Connecticut, U.S.	Retained WBC–NABF cruiserweight title
Loss	13-0	(Czech Republic) Rudolf Kraj	UD	12	08/03/2008	König Palast, Krefeld, Germany	
Win	13-2-3	(United States) Derrick Brown	UD	10	10/08/2007	(United States) Twin River Casino, Lincoln, Rhode Island, U.S.	Retained WBC–NABF cruiserweight title
Win	18-1-2	(United States) Felix Cora, Jr.	TKO	2 (12), 2:45	06/04/2007	(United States) Mohegan Sun, Uncasville, Connecticut, U.S.	Retained WBA–NABA cruiserweight title; Won vacant WBC–NABF cruiserweight title
Win	22-14	(Jamaica) Lloyd Bryan	TKO	4 (8), 0:35	01/12/2006	(United States) Rhode Island Convention Center, Providence, Rhode Island, U.S.	
Win	24-2-1	(United States) Danny Batchelder	UD	12	23/09/2006	(United States) Connecticut Convention Center, Hartford, Connecticut, U.S.	Retained WBC–USNBC and WBA–NABA cruiserweight titles; Won WBC Continental Americas cruiserweight title
Win	11-0-2	(United States) Shaun George	TKO	1 (12), 2:21	10/05/2006	(United States) Foxwoods Resort, Mashantucket, Connecticut, U.S.	Retained WBC–USNBC cruiserweight title; Won WBA–NABA cruiserweight title
Win	29-11-3	(United States) Ernest Mateen	TKO	2 (6), 1:51	13/02/2006	(United States) Dunkin' Donuts Center, Providence, Rhode Island, U.S.	
Win	6-5	(United States) Billy Willis	UD	6	23/11/2005	(United States) Rhode Island Convention Center, Providence, Rhode Island, U.S.	
Win	11-3-3	(United States) Willie Herring	UD	10	26/08/2005	(United States) Rhode Island Convention Center, Providence, Rhode Island, U.S.	Won vacant WBC–USNBC cruiserweight title
Win	17-8	(United States) Jermell Barnes	UD	8	17/06/2005	(United States) Dunkin' Donuts Center, Providence, Rhode Island, U.S.	
Win	4-1-2	(United States) Tony De la Garza	TKO	1 (6), 1:34	01/04/2005	(United States) City Wide Fieldhouse, New Haven, Connecticut, U.S.	
Win	6-5	(United States) Joe Johnson	TKO	4 (6), 2:37	29/10/2004	(United States) Foxwoods Resort, Mashantucket, Connecticut, U.S.	
Win	2-5-1	(Jamaica) Andrew Hutchinson	TKO	4	01/10/2004	(United States) Bayside Expo Center, Boston, Massachusetts, U.S.	
Win	2-0-1	(United States) Chris C. Riley	UD	4	27/07/2004	(United States) A La Carte Event Pavilion, Tampa, Florida, U.S.	
Win	2-0	(United States) Charles Tucker	TKO	1 (4), 1:28	20/07/2004	(United States) Joplin Memorial Hall, Joplin, Missouri, U.S.	
Win	--	(United States) Fitzroy Henry	TKO	1 (4), 2:27	12/06/2004	(United States) Foxwoods Resort, Mashantucket, Connecticut, U.S.	
Win	1-1	(United States) Glen Morgan	UD	4	14/05/2004	(United States) Rhode Island Convention Center, Providence, Rhode Island, U.S.	
