= Ali Ismayilov =

Azerbaijani boxer (born 1974)

Personal information
- Nickname: Bronze Ali
- Nationality: Azerbaijani
- Born: Əli Şamil İsmayılov; May 8, 1974 (age 52) Donetsk, Ukrainian SSR, Soviet Union
- Height: 5 ft 9.5 in (1.77 m)
- Weight: Cruiserweight

Boxing career
- Stance: Orthodox

Boxing record
- Total fights: 38
- Wins: 21
- Win by KO: 16
- Losses: 16
- Draws: 1
- No contests: 0

Ali Ismayilov
Medal record

Representing Azerbaijan

Men's Boxing

World Amateur Championships
Bronze medal – third place	Houston 1999	Light Heavyweight

European Amateur Championships
Bronze medal – third place	2000 Tampere	Light Heavyweight

Ali Ismayilov (born May 8, 1974) is a boxer from Azerbaijan, and the former WBO Latino Cruiserweight champion. He also challenged for the WBO cruiserweight title against Victor Emilio Ramírez.

== Amateur career ==
Ismayilov won the light heavyweight bronze medal at the 1999 World Amateur Boxing Championships in Houston, Texas. He won a bronze medal at the European Amateur Boxing Championships, followed by an early loss at the 2000 Olympics.

Ismayilov qualified for the 2004 Summer Olympics by ending up in first place at the 4th AIBA European 2004 Olympic Qualifying Tournament in Baku, Azerbaijan. He participated in the 2004 Summer Olympics in Athens, Greece, where he defeated Washington Silva but lost in the second round of the Light heavyweight (81 kg) division to Greece's Elias Pavlidis.

== Professional career ==
He turned pro as a cruiser and is 11-1 as of 2007. He became Golden Belt champion in 2008 when he defeated Luciano Torres.

== Professional boxing record ==
38 fights	21 wins	16 losses
By knockout	15	15
By decision	6	1
Draws	1	

No.	Result	Record	Opponent	Type	Round, time	Date	Location	Notes
38	Loss	21–16–1	Volkan Saka	RTD	2 (8), 3:00	3 Aug 2024	Istanbul, Turkey	
37	Win	21–15–1	Rasul Magomedov	TKO	2 (10), 1:54	10 Jun 2924	Moscow, Russia	
36	Loss	20–15–1	Bilal Kara	RTD	2 (8), 3:00	27 Apr 2924	Fethiye, Turkey	
35	Loss	20–14–1	Apti Davtaev	KO	1 (8), 1:05	24 Feb 2024	USC Soviet Wings, Moscow, Russia	
34	Loss	20–13–1	Metin Turunç	RTD	1 (8), 3:00	18 Feb 2024	Istanbul, Turkey	
33	Loss	20–12–1	Gürkan Karadağ	RTD	1 (10), 3:00	3 Feb 2024	Istanbul, Turkey	
32	Loss	20–11–1	Taryel Jafarov	KO	1 (10), 1:54	29 Oct 2023	Istanbul, Turkey	For vacant UBO International heavyweight title
31	Loss	20–10–1	Enrico Kölling	TKO	4 (10)	1 Jul 2023	Sportforum, Bernau, Germany	For vacant GBC Inter-Continental cruiserweight title
30	Loss	20–9–1	Yury Kashinsky	TKO	3 (10), 2:41	7 Apr 2021	USC Soviet Wings, Moscow, Russia	
29	Win	20–8–1	Orhan Namli	UD	4	23 Feb 2023	Baku, Azerbaijan	
28	Win	19–8–1	Joshgun Hasratzada	TKO	3 (4), 2:49	30 Jul 2022	Shagan Olympic Sport Complex Stadium, Baku, Azerbaijan	
27	Loss	18–8–1	Ismail Sillakh	TKO	4 (10), 2:06	4 Nov 2011	Khodynka Ice Palace, Moscow, Russia	
26	Loss	18–7–1	Dmytro Kucher	RTD	7 (8), 3:00	11 Jun 2011	Sport Palace, Kyiv, Ukraine	
25	Loss	18–6–1	David Quiñonero	KO	5 (8)	15 Apr 2011	Plaza de Toros La Cubierta, Leganés, Spain	
24	Loss	18–5–1	Mateusz Masternak	TKO	5 (12), 2:36	11 Mar 2011	Hala Urania, Olsztyn, Poland	For IBO Inter-Continental cruiserweight title
23	Loss	18–4–1	Yoan Pablo Hernández	KO	1 (12), 2:23	18 Dec 2010	Max-Schmeling-Halle, Prenzlauer Berg, Germany	
22	Win	18–3–1	József Nagy	TKO	3 (12)	25 Sep 2010	Ice Palace, Murmansk, Russia	Won vacant WBA-PABA cruiserweight title
21	Win	17–3–1	Jevgeņijs Andrejecs	UD	6	27 Feb 2010	Atmosphere Night Club, Saint Petersburg, Russia	
20	Loss	16–3–1	Denis Lebedev	RTD	6 (12), 3:00	17 Dec 2009	Gladiator Fight Club, Saint Petersburg, Russia	For WBO Inter-Continental cruiserweight title
19	Win	16–2–1	Zoltán Béres	TKO	2 (8), 2:53	25 Sep 2009	Atmosphere Night Club, Saint Petersburg, Russia	
18	Loss	15–2–1	Victor Emilio Ramírez	SD	12	16 May 2009	Estadio Luna Park, Buenos Aires, Argentina	For WBO cruiserweight title
17	Win	15–1–1	Rodolfo De Dominicis	TKO	3 (12), 0:53	27 Nov 2008	Yubileiny Sports Palace, Saint Petersburg, Russia	Retained WBO Latino cruiserweight title
16	Win	14–1–1	Max Alexander	UD	10	4 Oct 2008	PetersburgRegionGaz, Vyborg, Russia	
15	Win	13–1–1	Luzimar Gonzaga	KO	2 (12), 2:16	22 May 2008	Yubileyny Sports Palace, Saint Petersburg, Russia	Retained WBO Latino cruiserweight title
14	Win	12–1–1	Daniel Bispo	UD	8	3 Apr 2008	Gladiator Fight Club, Saint Petersburg, Russia	
13	Win	11–1–1	Agustín Álvarez	TKO	9 (12), 2:17	8 Dec 2007	Heydar Aliyev Sport and Exhibition Complex, Baku, Azerbaijan	Retained WBO Latino cruiserweight title
12	Win	10–1–1	Talgat Dosanov	UD	6	13 Oct 2007	Khodynka Ice Palace, Moscow, Russia	
11	Win	9–1–1	Rachid Al Hadak	UD	10	21 Jun 2007	Gladiator Fight Club, Saint Petersburg, Russia	
10	Win	8–1–1	Ibragim Khalilov	RTD	3 (8), 3:00	3 May 2007	Gladiator Fight Club, Saint Petersburg, Russia	
9	Win	7–1–1	Luciano Torres	KO	2 (12)	10 Feb 2007	Giant Hall, Casino Conti, Saint Petersburg, Russia	Won vacant WBO Latino cruiserweight title
8	Win	6–1–1	Aleh Dubiaha	TKO	7 (8)	12 Oct 2006	Grand Hall, Casino Conti, Saint Petersburg, Russia	
7	Win	5–1–1	Andriy Sipchenko	TKO	6 (8)	18 Jun 2006	Pyramide, Kazan, Russia	
6	Win	4–1–1	Roman Babaev	RTD	4 (6), 3:00	18 May 2006	Giant Hall, Casino Conti, Saint Petersburg, Russia	
5	Loss	3–1–1	Vadim Tokarev	RTD	8 (10), 3:00	17 Feb 2006	Pyramide, Kazan, Russia	
4	Win	3–0–1	Valery Makeev	TKO	2 (6)	24 Dec 2005	SKK Energetik, Sosnovy Bor, Russia	
3	Draw	2–0–1	Alexander Kotlobay	PTS	6	19 May 2005	Giant Hall, Casino Conti, Saint Petersburg, Russia	
2	Win	2–0	Vitali Dudik	KO	1 (6)	3 Mar 2005	Giant Hall, Casino Conti, Saint Petersburg, Russia	
1	Win	1–0	Vladimir Rumyantsev	KO	2 (4)	17 Dec 2004	Sports Games Palace, Baku, Azerbaijan	
