= Oleksandr Usyk vs. Marco Huck =

Boxing match

- Date: 9 September 2017
- Venue: Max-Schmeling-Halle, Prenzlauer Berg, Berlin, Germany
- Title(s) on the line: WBO cruiserweight title

Tale of the tape
Boxer	(Ukraine) Oleksandr Usyk	(Germany) Marco Huck
Nickname	"The Cat"	"Käpt'n"
Hometown	Simferopol, Crimea, Ukraine	Berlin, Germany
Pre-fight record	12–0 (10 KO)	40–4–1 (27 KO)
Age	30 years, 7 months	32 years, 9 months
Height	6 ft 3 in (191 cm)	6 ft 2 in (188 cm)
Weight	199 1/2 lb (90 kg)	198 4/5 lb (90 kg)
Style	Southpaw	Orthodox
Recognition	WBO; Cruiserweight Champion; The Ring/TBRB; No. 1 Ranked Cruiserweight	WBO; No. 9 Ranked Cruiserweight; The Ring; No. 7 Ranked Cruiserweight; TBRB; No. 10 Ranked Cruiserweight

Result
- Usyk defeats Huck in the 10th round via TKO

Oleksandr Usyk vs. Marco Huck was a professional boxing match contested on 9 September 2017, for the WBO Cruiserweight championship.

== Background ==
Having made two defences of the WBO belt he had won from Krzysztof Głowacki in September 2016, Oleksandr Usyk entered the World Boxing Super Series in July 2017 as odds on favourite to win. At the WBSS draft Gala, held at the Grimaldi Forum in Monaco on 8 July 2017, Usyk, who was the number one seed, chose to fight former WBO champion Marco Huck. When asked why he chose Huck, Usyk said, "Because of my fans." Huck, who was equally excited, replied that Usyk was his 'wish opponent'.

n 26 July it was announced that the fight would take place at the Max-Schmeling-Halle in Berlin on 9 September 2017. This would mark the second time Usyk would fight in Germany as a professional, having fought there in his third professional bout in April 2014. It would also mark the first fight of the tournament.

On 6 September, at the final press-conference, Huck pushed Usyk in the face-off. In regards to the shove, Huck said, "I wanted to show Usyk that he is in my hometown and that he should be prepared for the battle of his life on Saturday." Usyk, who remained professional and calm, replied, "If you want to be a great champion, you have to beat the best and Huck is one of the best. I chose to enter this tournament because it is a path to achieve my dream of unifying all the belts." As he was leaving the building, Usyk claimed he would 'bury' Huck.

== The fight ==
Usyk had little trouble in the fight, using his footwork to completely outbox Huck and continuously landing punches. In round 8, Usyk tripped on Huck's feet and Huck lost a point on the scorecards as he threw a punch at Usyk when the latter was down. Usyk continued to land combinations with little to no response from Huck until referee Robert Byrd stopped the fight in the tenth-round.

== Aftermath ==
With the win, Usyk progressed to the semi-final stage of the Super Series and was to face the winner of the Mairis Briedis vs. Mike Perez, scheduled for 30 September.

== Undercard ==
Confirmed bouts:

== Broadcasting ==
Country	Broadcaster
Baltic & Nordic countries	Viasat
Belgium	VOO
Bulgaria	Nova
Canada	Super Channel
Germany	SAT.1
Russia	Match! Boets
Singapore	StarHub
Sub-Saharan Africa	TVMS
Turkey	Tivibu Sports
United Kingdom	ITV
Ukraine	Inter

Preceded by vs. Michael Hunter	Oleksandr Usyk's bouts 9 September 2017	Succeeded by vs. Mairis Briedis
Preceded by vs. Mairis Briedis	Marco Huck's bouts 9 September 2017	Succeeded by vs. Yakup Saglam
