= Oleksandr Usyk vs. Mairis Briedis =

Boxing match

- Date: 27 January 2018
- Venue: Arēna Rīga, Riga, Latvia
- Title(s) on the line: WBC and WBO cruiserweight titles

Tale of the tape
Boxer	(Ukraine) Oleksandr Usyk	(Latvia) Mairis Briedis
Nickname	"The Cat"	"The Latvian Punisher"
Hometown	Simferopol, Crimea, Ukraine	Riga, Latvia
Pre-fight record	13–0 (11 KO)	23–0 (18 KO)
Age	31 years	33 years
Height	6 ft 3 in (191 cm)	6 ft 1 in (185 cm)
Weight	199.3 lb (90 kg)	199.1 lb (90 kg)
Style	Southpaw	Orthodox
Recognition	WBO; Cruiserweight Champion; The Ring/TBRB; No. 1 Ranked Cruiserweight	WBC; Cruiserweight Champion; The Ring; No. 3 Ranked Cruiserweight; TBRB; No. 6 Ranked Cruiserweight

Result
- Usyk defeats Briedis via MD (115–113, 114–114, 115–113)

Oleksandr Usyk vs. Mairis Briedis was a professional boxing match contested on 27 January 2018, for the WBC and WBO cruiserweight championship.

== Background ==
Following their respective September 2017 quarter final victories against Marco Huck and Mike Perez, it was reported the WBSS semi final between Oleksandr Usyk and Mairis Briedis would take place on 27 January 2018 in Riga, Latvia, a week before Murat Gassiev vs. Yuniel Dorticos. Arēna Rīga was confirmed as the location by Kalle Sauerland in early December.

Usyk came in at 199.5 pounds and Briedis weighed 199.1 pounds.

== The fight ==
With a high work rate, Usyk controlled most of the fight with his jab, putting on pressure when needed. Briedis was credited with landing the harder punches. The opening four rounds where closely contested and Usyk was cut from a head-butt over his right eye in round three. From round five, Usyk became busier and took control of the fight, although he was still hit with some hard shots to the head from Briedis. One judge scored the fight 114–114, whilst the remaining two judges scored the fight 115–113 in favour of Usyk making him the unified cruiserweight champion.

According to CompuBox stats, Usyk landed 212 of 848 punches thrown (25%) and Briedis was more accurate, landing 195 of his 579 thrown (33.7%).

== Aftermath ==
After the fight, Usyk stated it was the hardest fight of his career, saying "Those are the most difficult rounds I've had in my career, and we will work on the improvement of my style".

Many boxers and pundits praised the fight.

== Undercard ==
Confirmed bouts:

== Broadcasting ==
In Ukraine, the fight drew a 1.1 rating with 24.2 share in the commercial (Note: Viewers aged 18–54 from cities with population 50,000+) demographic.

Country	Broadcaster
Baltic & Nordic countries	Viasat
Belgium	VOO
Bulgaria	Nova
Canada	Super Channel
Germany	SAT.1
Russia	Match! Boets
Singapore	StarHub
Sub-Saharan Africa	TVMS
Turkey	Tivibu Sports
United Kingdom	ITV
United States	Audience
Ukraine	Inter

== Notes ==
Preceded by vs. Marco Huck	Oleksandr Usyk's bouts 27 January 2018	Succeeded by vs. Murat Gassiev
Preceded by vs. Mike Perez	Mairis Briedis's bouts 27 January 2018	Succeeded by vs. Brandon Deslaurier
