= Mairis Briedis =

Latvian boxer (born 1985)

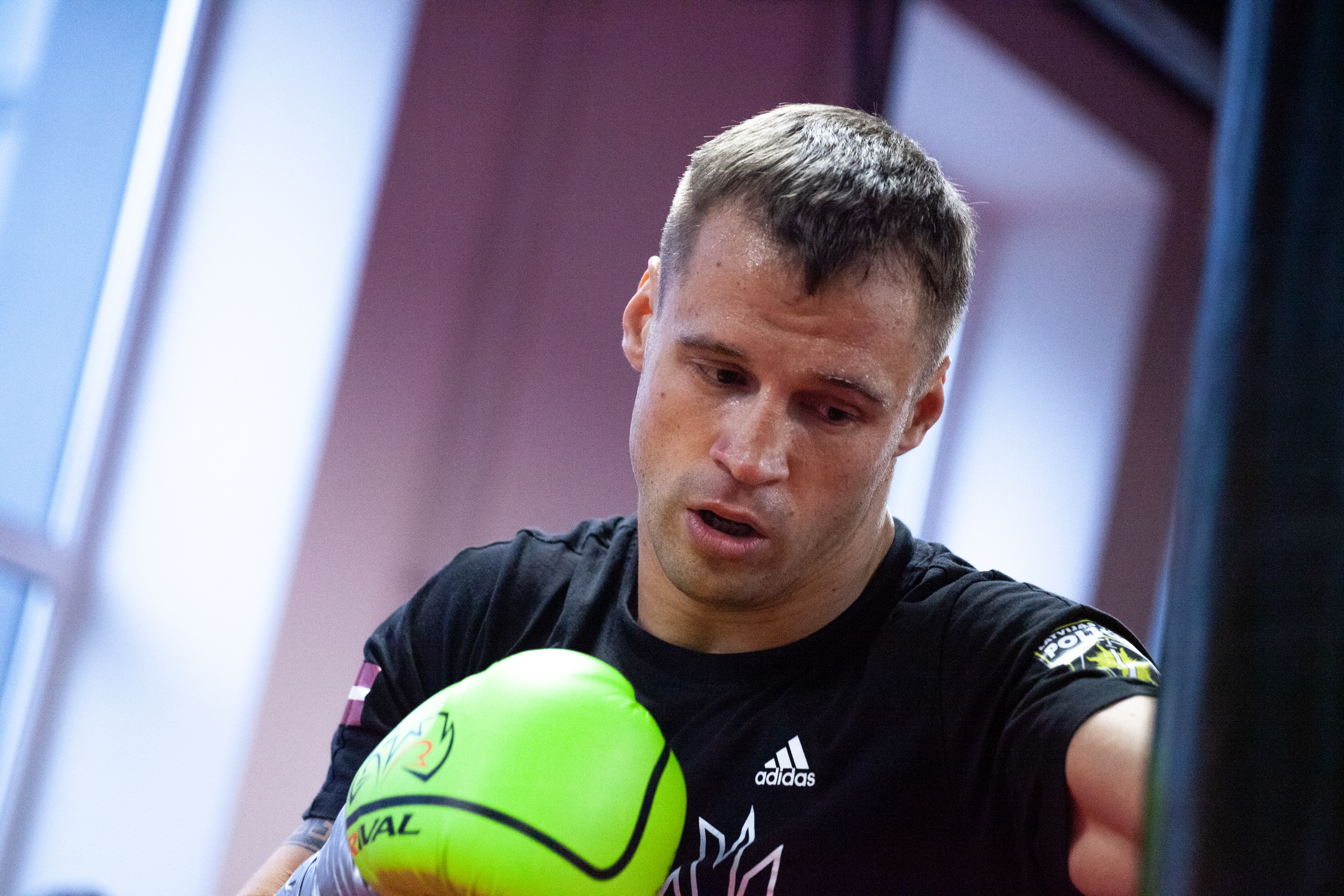
- Briedis in 2018

Personal information
- Nickname: The Latvian Punisher
- Nationality: Latvian
- Born: 13 January 1985 (age 41) Skrīveri, Latvian SSR, Soviet Union
- Height: 1.86 m (6 ft 1 in)
- Weight: Cruiserweight; Heavyweight

Boxing career
- Reach: 190 cm (75 in)
- Stance: Orthodox

Boxing record
- Total fights: 31
- Wins: 28
- Win by KO: 20
- Losses: 3
Medal record
Men's amateur boxing
Representing Latvia
Latvian National Championships
Gold medal – first place	2008 Riga	Heavyweight
Gold medal – first place	2009 Jelgava	Heavyweight
Gold medal – first place	2011 Jelgava	Heavyweight
Men's Full-Contact Kickboxing
Representing Latvia
WAKO European Championships
Gold medal – first place	2008 Varna	-86kg
WAKO World Championships
Bronze medal – third place	2005 Szeged	-86kg
Bronze medal – third place	2007 Coimbra	-86kg

Mairis Briedis (born 13 January 1985) is a Latvian former professional boxer who competed from 2009 to 2024. He was a three-time cruiserweight world champion, having held the IBF and Ring titles from 2020 to 2022; the WBC title from 2017 to 2018; and the WBO title in 2019. Upon winning the WBC title in 2017, he became the first Latvian to hold a world boxing title. He was awarded the Order of the Three Stars in 2017.

== Professional career ==
=== Early career ===
At the age of 24, after previously serving as a Latvian State Police officer in Rīga, Briedis turned professional in 2009. He racked up multiple wins in his home country and abroad, including a second-round technical knockout (TKO) of former heavyweight title challenger Danny Williams. He captured the IBA cruiserweight title along the way. Briedis' first fight of note came in 2015, when he moved up in weight and traveled to Russia to face former heavyweight title challenger Mahmoud Charr. Briedis knocked out his much bigger opponent with a single punch in the fifth round. In 2016, Briedis knocked out hard-hitting Nigerian Olanrewaju Durodola in a slug fest, to capture the WBC Silver cruiserweight title. This made him the mandatory challenger for the winner of Tony Bellew and Ilunga Makabu. Briedis was ringside for the fight and congratulated the victorious Bellew in his dressing room afterwards. Briedis then fought in the UK for the first time in a stay busy fight against Simon Vallily on the undercard of Bellew's first title defence against BJ Flores. Bellew vacated his title in early 2017, meaning the vacant title would be on the line in Briedis' next fight.

=== WBC cruiserweight champion ===
==== Briedis vs. Huck ====
Due to Tony Bellew fighting David Haye instead of taking on Briedis, the WBC ordered a match for the WBC interim cruiserweight title between Marco Huck and Briedis. The winner would earn a fight with Bellew for the full WBC title or possibly be elevated to full championship status if Bellew decided to vacate and stay at heavyweight. As Bellew didn't plan to defend his title for a while, he vacated the title in March 2017. On 1 April 2017 Briedis captured the vacant WBC cruiserweight title by defeating Huck via unanimous decision (UD) (118–109, 117–110, 116–111). Huck was deducted a point after an accidental clash of heads. Briedis was able to outbox the former two-time champion and prevent him from having any success on the inside during the fight. Some boxing pundits had Briedis winning every round in the fight. The IBO title, previously held by Huck, became vacant due to Briedis not paying the sanctioning fees.

=== 2017–18: World Boxing Super Series ===
On 2 June 2017 Briedis announced that he would take part in the inaugural World Boxing Super Series (WBSS), where the winner would receive a grand prize as well as the Muhammad Ali Trophy. Briedis described the bracket style tournament as the 'Champions League of boxing'.

==== Briedis vs. Perez ====
At the Draft Gala, which took place on 8 July in Monte Carlo, Briedis chose former heavyweight contender Mike Perez (22–2–1, 14 KOs) as his quarter-final opponent. Perez had been out of action for 25 months before moving down to the 200 pound limit division and won his first fight at that weight with a first-round knockout on 10 June 2017. On 22 July, the WBSS announced the fight would take place in Briedis' home country of Latvia at the Rīga Arēna in Riga on 30 September 2017. This was the eighth time Briedis fought at the arena. Briedis defeated Perez by UD over twelve rounds (116–110, 115–111, 114–112). Perez was deducted a point in round three following an accidental clash of heads. Briedis was also docked a point during round ten for excessive holding. With the win, Briedis moved on to the semi-finals to face top-seeded Oleksandr Usyk.

==== Briedis vs. Usyk ====
Briedis had the next fight against Usyk (13–0, 11 KOs), following the latter's win over Marco Huck. In November 2017, it was reported the fight would take place on 27 January 2018 in Riga, Latvia, a week before Gassiev vs. Dorticos would take place. Arēna Rīga was confirmed as the location by Comosa's Chief Boxing Officer Kalle Sauerland. Usyk came in at 199.5 pounds and Briedis weighed 199.1 pounds. Usyk moved on to the final of the tournament after defeating Briedis via majority decision (MD). With a high work rate, Usyk controlled most of the fight with his jab, putting on pressure when needed. Briedis was credited with landing the harder punches. The opening four rounds where closely contested and Usyk was cut from a head-butt over his right eye in round three. From round five, Usyk became busier and took control of the fight, although he was still hit with some hard shots to the head from Briedis. One judge scored the fight 114–114, whilst the remaining two judges scored the fight 115–113 in favour of Usyk. After the fight, Usyk stated it was the hardest fight of his career. According to CompuBox stats, Usyk landed 212 of 848 punches thrown (25%) and Briedis was more accurate, landing 195 of his 579 thrown (33.7%). Usyk landed 40% of his power punches. Many boxers and pundits praised the fight.

==== Reserve fight ====
On 28 June 2018, Briedis began training for his next bout, which was speculated to take place on the undercard of the WBSS final on 21 July at the Olympic Stadium in Moscow. His opponent was later announced to be French boxer Brandon Deslaurier (11–1–1, 1 KO). Briedis was also confirmed as the WBSS final substitute in case either Usyk or Murat Gassiev could not compete. The bout with Deslaurier was scheduled for ten rounds. Briedis went the ten-round distance, defeating Deslaurier via UD. All three judges scored the fight 100–90.

=== 2018–19: World Boxing Super Series ===
In August 2018, Briedis, along with Yuniel Dorticos, entered a second edition of the WBSS. Unlike the inaugural tournament, there were no world champions, as Usyk had unified all the titles. Mateusz Masternak, Krzysztof Głowacki and Maxim Vlasov were other top contenders to join.

==== Briedis vs. Mikaelian ====
As the #1 seed, Briedis chose to fight German boxer Noel Mikaelian (23–1, 10 KOs). Gevor was ranked at #14 by the WBC. On 26 September, it was announced that the Briedis vs. Gevor bout, along with the Głowacki vs. Vlasov would take place as a doubleheader on 10 November at the UIC Pavilion in Chicago, US.

==== Briedis vs. Głowacki ====
On 15 June 2019 Briedis won the WBO cruiserweight title in a controversial fight against Głowacki (31–1, 19 KOs). Briedis won by TKO in the third round but appeared to intentionally foul his opponent with an elbow strike after being hit on the back of the neck in the second. The WBO's report on the fight also stated that the referee Robert Byrd made "multiple errors" in officiating the fight and ordered a rematch. Briedis was later stripped of the title after refusing to defend it in a direct rematch fight with Głowacki rather than proceeding with the WBSS tournament Final.

==== Briedis vs. Dorticos ====
Briedis was scheduled to face Yuniel Dorticos on 26 September 2020 at the Plazamedia Broadcasting Center in Munich, Germany, for the WBSS tournament final. Mairis Briedis beat Yuniel Dorticos by majority decision in their 12-round contest on Saturday 26 September 2020 at Plazamedia Broadcasting Center in Munich. The scorecards were announced as 111–117, 114–114, 111–117 in favor of winner Mairis Briedis. The fight took place over rounds in the Cruiserweight division, which meant the weight limit was 200 pounds (14.3 stone or 90.7 KG). This was the final of the World Boxing Super Series. This was a unique fight as there were almost no spectators because of the coronavirus precaution in the EU.

=== IBF & Ring cruiserweight champion ===
==== Briedis vs. Mann ====
Briedis was booked to defend his IBF and The Ring cruiserweight titles against the former WBO International titlist and one-time IBO Cruiserweight title challenger Artur Mann. The bout was scheduled for 16 October 2021, at the Arena Riga in Riga, Latvia. Briedis made quick work of his opponent, beating him by technical knockout near the end of the third round. The stoppage was preceded by two knockdowns, one coming with 10 seconds left in the second round, while the second came 39 seconds before the knockout itself. Briedis called out the reigning WBO cruiserweight champion Lawrence Okolie in his post-fight interview, stating: "Eddie Hearn, give Okolie the money, and we’ll make the fight. If this happens, it will be a mega fight in the UK".

=== Consecutive losses ===
==== Briedis vs. Opetaia ====
Briedis was scheduled to make his second IBF and The Ring title defense against the undefeated mandatory title challenger Jai Opetaia on 6 April 2022, at the TBD venue in Australia. The bout was postponed on February 16, as Briedis tested positive for COVID-19. The bout was rescheduled for 11 May, and was expected to take place at the Gold Coast Convention and Exhibition Centre in Broadbeach, Queensland, Australia. The bout was once again postponed on April 8, as Opetaia suffered a rib injury, and rescheduled for July 2.

GO3 platform and TV3 Group refused to broadcast the fight because of Briedis' ambiguous views about the Russian invasion of Ukraine. Briedis lost the fight by unanimous decision, with scores of 116–112, 116–112 and 115–113. He had a late surge in the fight, during which he managed to break Opetaia's jaw, but was unable to win enough rounds on the judges' scorecards.

==== Briedis vs. Opetaia II ====
On May 18, 2024 in Riyadh, Saudi Arabia, Briedis lost the rematch for the vacant IBF cruiserweight title against Jai Opetaia by unanimous decision.

=== Retirement ===
Briedis announced his retirement from professional boxing on 19 August 2024.

== Professional boxing record ==
31 fights	28 wins	3 losses
By knockout	20	0
By decision	8	3

No.	Result	Record	Opponent	Type	Round, time	Date	Location	Notes
31	Loss	28–3	Jai Opetaia	UD	12	18 May 2024	Kingdom Arena, Riyadh, Saudi Arabia	For The Ring and vacant IBF cruiserweight titles
30	Loss	28–2	Jai Opetaia	UD	12	2 Jul 2022	Gold Coast Convention Centre, Broadbeach, Queensland, Australia	Lost IBF and The Ring cruiserweight titles
29	Win	28–1	Artur Mann	TKO	3 (12), 2:59	16 Oct 2021	Arēna Rīga, Riga, Latvia	Retained IBF and The Ring cruiserweight titles
28	Win	27–1	Yuniel Dorticos	MD	12	26 Sep 2020	Plazamedia Broadcasting Center, Munich, Germany	Won IBF and vacant The Ring cruiserweight titles; World Boxing Super Series: Cruiserweight final
27	Win	26–1	Krzysztof Głowacki	TKO	3 (12), 0:27	15 Jun 2019	Arēna Rīga, Riga, Latvia	Won WBO cruiserweight title; World Boxing Super Series: Cruiserweight semi-final
26	Win	25–1	Noel Mikaelian	UD	12	10 Nov 2018	UIC Pavilion, Chicago, Illinois, U.S.	World Boxing Super Series: Cruiserweight quarter-final
25	Win	24–1	Brandon Deslaurier	UD	10	21 Jul 2018	Olympic Stadium, Moscow, Russia	
24	Loss	23–1	Oleksandr Usyk	MD	12	27 Jan 2018	Arēna Rīga, Rīga, Latvia	Lost WBC cruiserweight title; For WBO cruiserweight title; World Boxing Super Series: Cruiserweight semi-final
23	Win	23–0	Mike Perez	UD	12	30 Sep 2017	Arēna Rīga, Rīga, Latvia	Retained WBC cruiserweight title; World Boxing Super Series: Cruiserweight quarter-finals
22	Win	22–0	Marco Huck	UD	12	1 Apr 2017	Westfalenhallen, Dortmund, Germany	Won vacant WBC cruiserweight title
21	Win	21–0	Simon Vallily	TKO	3 (8), 2:36	15 Oct 2016	Echo Arena, Liverpool, England	
20	Win	20–0	Olanrewaju Durodola	TKO	9 (12), 2:58	14 May 2016	Arēna Rīga, Rīga, Latvia	Won WBC Silver cruiserweight title
19	Win	19–0	Danie Venter	TKO	2 (12), 2:05	21 Feb 2016	Arēna Rīga, Rīga, Latvia	Won vacant IBF Inter-Continental cruiserweight title
18	Win	18–0	László Hubert	TKO	2 (6), 2:42	6 Nov 2015	Palais, Frankfurt, Germany	
17	Win	17–0	Mahmoud Charr	KO	5 (10), 2:55	22 Aug 2015	Akhmat-Arena, Grozny, Russia	
16	Win	16–0	Emre Altintas	TKO	2 (6), 1:35	28 Jun 2015	Fruchthalle, Kaiserslautern, Germany	
15	Win	15–0	Björn Blaschke	TKO	4 (6), 1:45	10 Apr 2015	Kongress Und Sportzentrum, Hessen, Germany	
14	Win	14–0	Ismail Abdoul	UD	12	14 Nov 2014	Olympic Hall, Liepāja, Latvia	Retained IBA cruiserweight title
13	Win	13–0	Csaba Faur	KO	1 (6), 1:45	26 Sep 2014	Palais, Frankfurt, Germany	
12	Win	12–0	Joey Vegas	TKO	9 (10), 1:09	26 Jul 2014	Ķīpsala Exhibition Centre, Rīga, Latvia	Won vacant WBC Baltic cruiserweight title
11	Win	11–0	Luboš Šuda	RTD	5 (12), 3:00	22 Nov 2013	Olympic Hall, Liepāja, Latvia	Won vacant IBA cruiserweight title
10	Win	10–0	Jérémy Ouanna	UD	8	5 Jul 2013	Olympic Hall, Porto Carras, Greece	
9	Win	9–0	Jonathan Felton	TKO	2 (6), 2:41	14 Jun 2013	The Ritz, Raleigh, North Carolina, U.S.	
8	Win	8–0	Danny Williams	TKO	2 (6), 1:09	23 Mar 2013	Arēna Rīga, Rīga, Latvia	
7	Win	7–0	Marko Angermann	TKO	2 (6), 2:38	20 Oct 2012	Arēna Rīga, Rīga, Latvia	
6	Win	6–0	József Nagy	TKO	2 (6), 1:07	16 Jun 2012	Sports Complex Majori, Jūrmala, Latvia	
5	Win	5–0	Ruslan Siniavskij	TKO	1 (6), 2:50	24 Mar 2012	Arēna Rīga, Rīga, Latvia	
4	Win	4–0	Andrejs Naglis	KO	2 (6), 0:25	8 Oct 2011	Arēna Rīga, Rīga, Latvia	
3	Win	3–0	Josip Jalušić	TKO	1 (6)	2 Jun 2011	Arena Riga, Rīga, Latvia	
2	Win	2–0	Gábor Zsalek	TKO	1 (6), 3:00	12 Jun 2010	Hala Sportowa, Krynica Zdrój, Poland	
1	Win	1–0	Raulis Racilauskas	UD	4	11 Oct 2009	Rīga Hanza Secondary School, Rīga, Latvia	

== Titles in boxing ==
=== Major world titles ===
- WBC cruiserweight champion (200 lbs)
- IBF cruiserweight champion (200 lbs)
- WBO cruiserweight champion (200 lbs)

=== The Ring magazine titles ===
- The Ring cruiserweight champion (200 lbs)

=== Silver world titles (Note: In 2010, the WBC created the "Silver Championship", intended as a replacement for interim titles.) ===
- WBC Silver cruiserweight champion (200 lbs)

=== Minor world titles ===
- IBA cruiserweight champion (200 lbs)

=== Regional/International titles ===
- WBC Baltic cruiserweight champion (200 lbs)
- IBF Inter-Continental cruiserweight champion (200 lbs)

=== Honorary titles ===
- WBC Diamond cruiserweight champion

== Politics ==
On 18 July 2022, Briedis announced on his Instagram page that he would run in the 2022 Latvian parliamentary election as a candidate of Social Democratic Party "Harmony", which he believed "dedicates its efforts to reduce the split in society". Briedis' decision received a mixed reaction in the Latvian society. Briedis was elected to the Riga City Council in the 2025 Latvian municipal elections on the populist For Stability! party list, but reportedly did not join the party and sits as an independent among the For Stability! faction. He later left the For Stability! political faction.

== See also ==
- List of world cruiserweight boxing champions

== Notes and references ==
=== References ===
Sporting positions
Regional boxing titles
Vacant Title last held by Murat Gassiev	IBF Inter-Continental cruiserweight champion 21 February 2016 – May 2016; Vacated	Vacant Title next held by Krzysztof Włodarczyk
Preceded by Olanrewaju Durodola	WBC Silver cruiserweight champion 14 May 2016 – October 2016; Vacated	Vacant Title next held by Dmitry Kudryashov
New title	WBC Diamond cruiserweight champion 10 November 2018 – 2018; Vacated	Vacant
Minor world boxing titles
Vacant Title last held by Bobby Gunn	IBA cruiserweight champion 22 November 2013 – April 2015; Vacated	Vacant
Major world boxing titles
Vacant Title last held by Tony Bellew	WBC cruiserweight champion 1 April 2017 – 27 January 2018	Succeeded by Oleksandr Usyk
Preceded by Krzysztof Głowacki	WBO cruiserweight champion 15 June 2019 – 25 November 2019; Stripped	Vacant Title next held by Lawrence Okolie
Preceded by Yuniel Dorticos	IBF cruiserweight champion 26 September 2020 – 2 July 2022	Succeeded by Jai Opetaia
Vacant Title last held by Oleksandr Usyk	The Ring cruiserweight champion 26 September 2020 – 2 July 2022	Succeeded by Jai Opetaia
