= Noel Mikaelian =

Armenian-German boxer (born 1990)

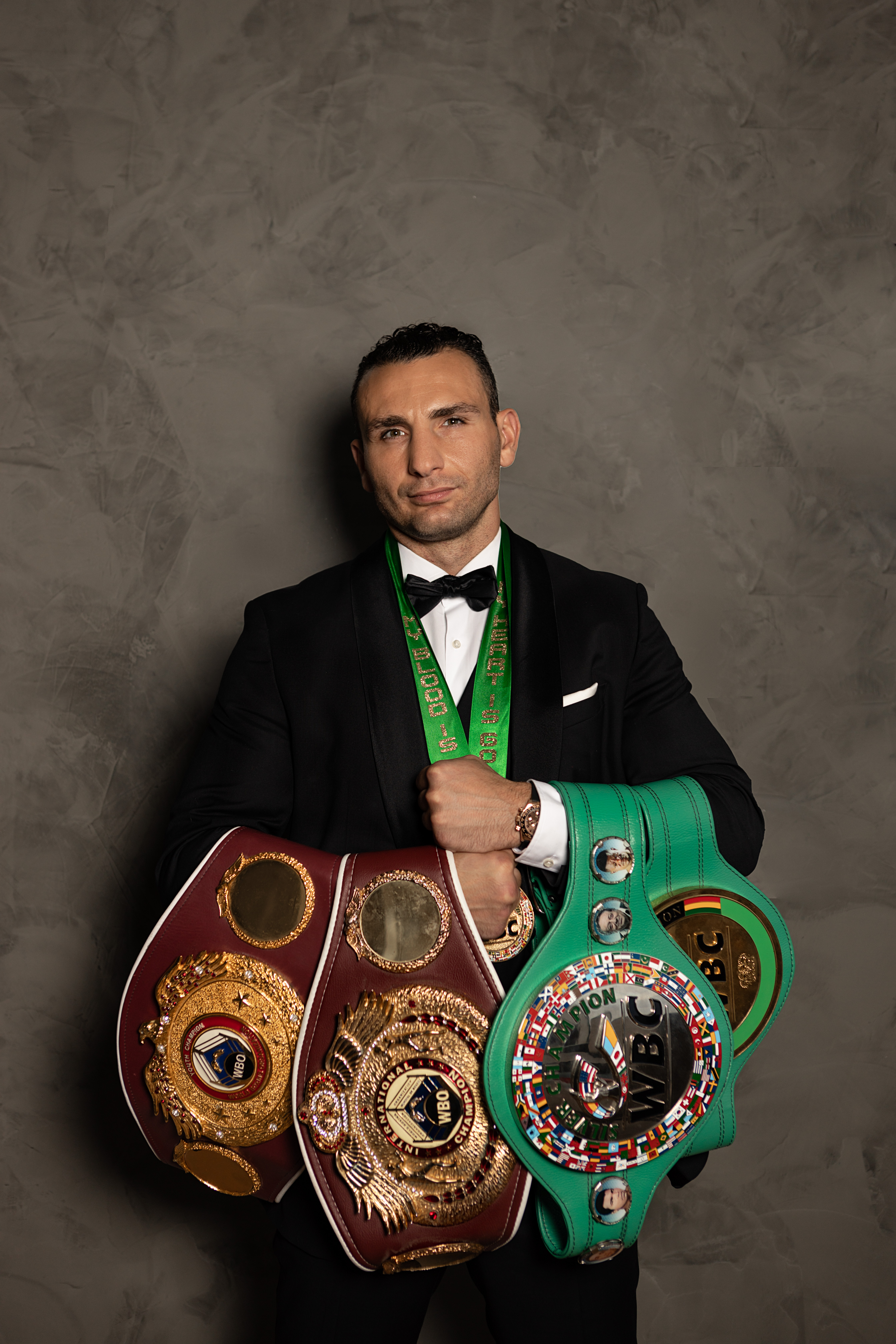
- Mikaelian in 2022

Personal information
- Nickname: Dark Horse
- Nationality: German
- Born: Norair Mikaelian; 18 September 1990 (age 36) Yerevan, Armenian SSR, Soviet Union
- Height: 1.90 m (6 ft 3 in)
- Weight: Cruiserweight

Boxing career
- Reach: 191 cm (75 in)
- Stance: Orthodox

Boxing record
- Total fights: 32
- Wins: 28
- Win by KO: 12
- Losses: 4

Norair Mikaelian (born 18 September 1990), better known as Noel Gevor Mikaelian, is an Armenian-born German professional boxer. He is a two-time World Boxing Council (WBC) cruiserweight champion having held the title between 2023 to 2026.

== Professional career ==
Mikaelian made his professional debut against Adam Gadajew on 27 May 2011. He won the fight on points after four rounds. Mikaelian amassed an 18–0 record during the next four years, before being booked to fight Daniel Alejandro Sanabria for the vacant WBO International cruiserweight title on 5 September 2015, the first regional championship of his career. He captured the vacant belt by unanimous decision, with scores of 99–90, 98–91 and 100–89. Mikaelian made his first title defense against Valery Brudov on 9 January 2016. He won the fight by unanimous decision, with two scorecards of 99–91 and one scorecard of 98–92. Mikaelian made his second title defense against Cristian Javier Medina on 7 May 2016. He won the fight by unanimous decision, with all three judges scoring the bout 98–92 in his favor. Mikaelian made his third title defense against Stephen Simmons on 14 October 2016. He won the fight by split decision, with scores of 116–112, 116–112 and 113–116.

On 28 April 2017, it was announced that Mikaelian would face Krzysztof Włodarczyk in an IBF cruiserweight title eliminator. The bout headlined a card which took place at the Hala Arena in Poznań, Poland on 20 May 2017. He lost the fight by split decision. One judge scored the bout 115–113 in his favor, while the remaining two judges scored it 116–112 and 115–114 for Włodarczyk.

Mikaelian faced the #1 seed of the 2018 World Boxing Cruiserweight Super Series Mairis Briedis on 10 November 2018, in the main event of an ESPN broadcast card, which took place at the Credit Union 1 Arena in Chicago, Illinois. Although Briedis was a 25-1 favourite, Mikaelian largely controlled the bout with jabs and hard rights landed on Briedis. However, the judges controversially awarded the fight to Briedis by unanimous decision, with scores of 114–112, 115–111 and 116–110.

Mikaelian faced Jesse Bryan for the vacant WBC International cruiserweight title on 12 December 2020, following an eighteen-month absence from the sport. He won the fight by a fourth-round technical knockout. Mikaelian next faced the former WBA interim cruiserweight champion Youri Kalenga on 12 February, this time coming back from a fourteen-month absence from the sport. He won the fight by unanimous decision, with scores of 119–109, 118–108 and 117–111.

On December 9, it was revealed that Mikaelian would fight Ilunga Makabu for the WBC cruiserweight title. The bout was expected to take place at the Casino Miami Jai-Alai in Miami, Florida, on 21 January 2023, but was abruptly cancelled when Makabu was arranged to defend the belt against Badou Jack instead on 26 February, despite Mikaelian being the mandatory challenger. After Jack vacated the belt to move up to bridgerweight, Mikaelian was scheduled to fight Makabu for the vacant title on 4 November 2023, at the Casino Miami Jai Alai in Miami, Florida. Mikaelian won the fight by a third-round technical knockout and became the new WBC cruiserweight champion of the world.

Mikaelian challenged Badou Jack, who was reinstated to WBC cruiserweight champion in December 2024, for his title on May 3, 2025 at Anb Arena in Riyadh, Saudi Arabia, replacing Ryan Rozicki, who pulled out with injury. He lost by majority decision.

A rematch took place at Ace Mission Studios in Los Angeles, California, USA, on December 13, 2025. Mikaelian won via unanimous decision.

On March 26, 2026, it was announced that Mikaelian was offered to defend his WBC cruiserweight title against Lyubomyr Pinchuk in June 2026.

== Professional boxing record ==
32 fights	28 wins	4 losses
By knockout	12	1
By decision	16	3

No.	Result	Record	Opponent	Type	Round, time	Date	Location	Notes
32	Loss	28–4	Jai Opetaia	TKO	9 (12), 1:30	12 Sep 2026	T-Mobile Arena, Paradise, Nevada, U.S.	For Zuffa Boxing, The Ring and vacant WBA (Regular) cruiserweight titles
31	Win	28–3	Badou Jack	UD	12	13 Dec 2025	Ace Mission Studios, Los Angeles, California, US	Won WBC cruiserweight title
30	Loss	27–3	Badou Jack	MD	12	3 May 2025	Anb Arena, Riyadh, Saudi Arabia	For WBC cruiserweight title
29	Win	27–2	Ilunga Makabu	TKO	3 (12), 1:00	4 Nov 2023	Casino Miami, Miami, Florida, US	Won vacant WBC cruiserweight title
28	Win	26–2	Youri Kalenga	UD	12	12 Feb 2022	Studio 69, Riga, Latvia	Won vacant WBC Silver cruiserweight title
27	Win	25–2	Jesse Bryan	TKO	4 (10), 1:50	12 Dec 2020	Airport Hilton, Miami, Florida, US	Won vacant WBC International cruiserweight title
26	Win	24–2	Isossa Mondo	UD	8	15 Jun 2019	Studio 69, Riga, Latvia	
25	Loss	23–2	Mairis Briedis	UD	12	10 Nov 2018	Credit Union 1 Arena, Chicago, Illinois, US	World Boxing Super Series: Cruiserweight quarter-final
24	Win	23–1	Isiah Thomas	UD	10	9 Sep 2017	Max-Schmeling-Halle, Berlin, Germany	
23	Loss	22–1	Krzysztof Włodarczyk	SD	12	20 May 2017	Hala Arena, Poznań, Poland	
22	Win	22–0	Stephen Simmons	SD	12	14 Oct 2016	Inselparkhalle, Hamburg, Germany	Retained WBO International cruiserweight title
21	Win	21–0	Cristian Javier Medina	UD	10	7 May 2016	Barclays Arena, Hamburg, Germany	Retained WBO International cruiserweight title
20	Win	20–0	Valery Brudov	UD	10	9 Jan 2016	Baden-Arena, Offenburg, Germany	Retained WBO International cruiserweight title
19	Win	19–0	Daniel Alejandro Sanabria	UD	10	5 Sep 2015	EnergieVerbund Arena, Dresden, Germany	Won vacant WBO International cruiserweight title
18	Win	18–0	Lukasz Rusiewicz	UD	8	18 Jul 2015	OWL Arena, Halle, Germany	
17	Win	17–0	Mohamed Azzaoui	KO	5 (8), 2:07	25 Apr 2015	Columbiahalle, Kreuzberg, Germany	
16	Win	16–0	Alejandro Emilio Valori	UD	8	21 Feb 2015	O2 World Arena, Kreuzberg, Germany	
15	Win	15–0	Tamas Polster	TKO	5 (8), 2:51	13 Dec 2014	MusikTeatret, Copenhagen, Denmark	
14	Win	14–0	Tamas Lodi	TKO	7 (10), 1:18	27 Sep 2014	Sparkassen-Arena, Kiel, Germany	
13	Win	13–0	Ismail Abdoul	UD	8	16 Aug 2014	Messe Erfurt, Erfurt, Germany	
12	Win	12–0	Bela Juhasz	KO	2 (8), 2:29	7 Jun 2014	Sport- und Kongresshalle, Schwerin, Germany	
11	Win	11–0	Gogita Gorgiladze	UD	10	3 May 2014	Velodrom, Berlin, Germany	Won vacant WBO Youth cruiserweight title
10	Win	10–0	Loris Emiliani	KO	7 (8), 1:45	25 Jan 2014	Hanns-Martin-Schleyer-Halle, Stuttgart, Germany	
9	Win	9–0	Sandro Siproshvili	UD	8	23 Nov 2013	Brose Arena, Bamberg, Germany	
8	Win	8–0	Juan Manuel Garay	UD	6	8 Jun 2013	Max-Schmeling-Halle, Berlin, Germany	
7	Win	7–0	Viktor Szalai	TKO	4 (6), 2:30	16 Mar 2013	Sportforum, Bernau, Germany	
6	Win	6–0	Slavomir Selicky	TKO	1 (6), 2:00	22 Feb 2013	Strada Henri Coanda, Galați, Romania	
5	Win	5–0	Michal Bilak	PTS	6	7 Jul 2012	Boxsporthalle Braamkamp, Hamburg, Germany	
4	Win	4–0	Marko Angermann	RTD	2 (6), 3:00	11 May 2012	EWS Arena, Göppingen, Germany	
3	Win	3–0	Rushid Sevim	TKO	2 (4)	3 Sep 2011	Kugelbake-Halle, Cuxhaven, Germany	
2	Win	2–0	Vaclav Fiala	TKO	1 (4), 1:38	15 Jul 2011	EWS Arena, Göppingen, Germany	
1	Win	1–0	Adam Gadajew	PTS	4	27 May 2011	Alte Brauerei, Stralsund, Germany	

== See also ==
- Armenians in Germany
- List of world cruiserweight boxing champions

Sporting positions
World boxing titles
Vacant Title last held by Badou Jack	WBC cruiserweight champion 4 November 2023 – 11 December 2024; Status changed	Succeeded by Badou Jack; Champion in recess reinstated
Preceded by Badou Jack	WBC cruiserweight champion 13 December 2025 – 14 September 2026; Stripped	Succeeded by Michał Cieślak; Interim champion promoted
