= Shigabudin Aliev =

Russian boxer (born 1993)

Personal information
- Born: Shigabudin Alievich Aliev; 12 May 1993 (age 33) Kizilyurt, Russia
- Height: 6 ft 2 in (188 cm)
- Weight: Heavyweight

Boxing career
- Stance: Orthodox

Boxing record
- Total fights: 14
- Wins: 13
- Win by KO: 10

Shigabudin Alievich Aliev (Russian: Шигабудин Алиевич Алиев; born 12 May 1993) is a Russian professional boxer.

== Amateur career ==
Prior to turning professional, Aliev competed in the heavyweight division (91+ kg) of the 2018 World Series of Boxing (WSB), as part of team Dynamo Moscow, winning his bout against Nursultan Amanzholov by MD.

== Professional career ==
In July 2018, Aliev scored a second-round TKO victory over Irakli Gvenetadze to take his record to 3–0.

Aliev faced former world title challenger Kevin Johnson (34–13–1, 18 KOs) at the Red Square in Moscow on 22 July 2019, winning by unanimous decision.

In his ninth bout, on 3 July 2020, Aliev defeated Artush Sarkisyan by knockout in the sixth round.

In December 2020, the WBC announced the first set of rankings for the new bridgerweight division, with Aliev at #10.

Aliev faced Ruslan Fayfer (27–3, 19 KOs) at the Usadba Familiya in Plastunovskaya on 30 October 2021, fighting to a ten-round draw. Aliev faced Fayfer for the second time at the Basket Hall on 31 March 2022, winning by TKO in the sixth round.

== Professional boxing record ==
14 fights	13 wins	0 losses
By knockout	10	0
By decision	3	0
Draws	1	

No.	Result	Record	Opponent	Type	Round, time	Date	Location	Notes
14	Win	13–0–1	Bakhromjon Fozilov	TKO	3 (6), 0:51	6 Jun 2026	The Gallery Meydan, Dubai, UAE	
13	Win	12–0–1	Ashish Ahlawat	TKO	1 (6), 0:48	12 Dec 2025	Lock, Stock And Barrel JBR, Dubai, UAE	
12	Win	11–0–1	Alexander Zubkov	TKO	2 (6), 2:40	31 Aug 2023	Moscow, Russia	
11	Win	10–0–1	Ruslan Fayfer	TKO	6 (10), 2:18	31 Mar 2022	Basket Hall, Krasnodar, Russia	
10	Draw	9–0–1	Ruslan Fayfer	SD	10	30 Oct 2021	Usadba Familiya, Plastunovskaya, Russia	
9	Win	9–0	Artush Sarkisyan	KO	6 (8), 1:01	3 Jul 2020	Soviet Wings Sport Palace, Moscow, Russia	
8	Win	8–0	Kevin Johnson	UD	10	22 Jul 2019	Red Square, Moscow, Russia	
7	Win	7–0	Luis Pascual	KO	1 (8), 1:29	23 Mar 2019	Sport Palace, Serpukhov, Russia	
6	Win	6–0	Gaybullo Kuchkarov	TKO	4 (6), 2:02	21 Dec 2018	Sports Hall, Astrakhan, Russia	
5	Win	5–0	Pavel Doroshilov	MD	6	9 Dec 2018	Luzhniki Palace of Sports, Moscow, Russia	
4	Win	4–0	Tornike Puritchamiashvili	UD	4	31 Aug 2018	Moscow, Russia	
3	Win	3–0	Irakli Gvenetadze	TKO	2 (4), 2:23	21 Jul 2018	Olympic Stadium, Moscow, Russia	
2	Win	2–0	Avaz Rustamov	TKO	2 (4), 2:05	12 Jun 2018	Ali Aliev Sports Palace, Kaspiysk, Russia	
1	Win	1–0	Aleh Zablotski	TKO	2 (4), 2:15	30 May 2018	Zimniy Stadion, Saint Petersburg, Russia	

== World Series of Boxing record ==
1 fight	1 win	0 losses
By decision	1	0

No.	Result	Record	Opponent	Type	Round, time	Date	Location	Notes
1	Win	1–0	Nursultan Amanzholov	MD	5	11 Mar 2018	Platonov Sports Palace, Saint Petersburg, Russia	
