= Keith Tapia =

Puerto Rican professional boxer (born 1990)

Personal information
- Nickname: Machine Gun
- Nationality: Puerto Rican
- Born: September 29, 1990 (age 35) Bronx, New York
- Height: 6 ft 2 in (1.88 m)
- Weight: Cruiserweight

Boxing career
- Reach: 80 in (203 cm)
- Stance: Orthodox

Boxing record
- Total fights: 20
- Wins: 18
- Win by KO: 11
- Losses: 2
Medal record
Men's boxing
Representing United States
Cadet World Championships
Bronze medal – third place	Istanbul 2006	Heavyweight
Representing Puerto Rico
Cadet World Championships
Gold medal – first place	Chicago 2007	Heavyweight
Torneo Internacional José "Cheo" Aponte
Gold medal – first place	Caguas 2011	Heavyweight
Copa Olímpica Internacional
Gold medal – first place	San Juan 2010	Heavyweight
Gold medal – first place	San Juan 2011	Heavyweight

Keith Tapia (born September 29, 1990) is a Puerto Rican professional boxer. He was born in Bronx, New York, where he lived his childhood as part of the large Nuyorican community; he began boxing there and represented the United States for few international tournaments, in the process winning bronze at the 2006 Cadet World Championships. In 2007, Tapia appealed to his Puerto Rican heritage and ethnicity and changed his Olympic nationality, representing Puerto Rico until his amateur retirement in 2011. Under the Puerto Rican flag, he won gold at the 2007 AIBA Cadet World Championships and other international tournaments, while winning the heavyweight national championship locally. On November 18, 2011, Tapia made his professional debut, now boxing out of Carolina, Puerto Rico.

== Amateur career ==
=== Early life and introduction to boxing ===
Tapia was introduced to boxing while living in New York, when his parents took him to a gymnasium in order to control his weight and quickly employed his energy excess to establish a high-intensity training regime. He developed an admiration for the boxing styles of Wilfredo Gómez and Muhammad Ali, which influenced his style and created a preference towards technical boxing, instead of brawling and pursuing a knockout punch.

- Gold at the National Silver Gloves in 2006 (81 kg, 178 lbs)
- Gold at the Aliyev Cup in May, 2006 (80 kg) – "Tapia won three bouts en route to his gold medal, beating John Conners of Ireland in the quarterfinals; stopping Akmaljon Rakhmovon of Uzbekistan in the semifinals; and defeating Asim Isgandarov of Azerbaijan in the finals" (Source:USA boxing)
- Gold at the National AAU Junior Olympic Games in 2006 (86 kg, 186 lbs)
- Bronze at the Cadet World Championships in 2006, lost to Russian Vitali Kudukhov 10:15.

=== Representing Puerto Rico and Cadet World Championship ===
In 2007, Tapia decided to represent Puerto Rico in AIBA competition based on being a full-blood Puerto Rican despite being born in New York, with both of his parents originating from there. Upon moving to the archipelago from New York, Tapia joined Club Diamante and was trained by Ricardo "Ricky" Márquez. Tapia's first competition for the Puerto Rico national cadet boxing team was the 2007 AIBA Cadet World Boxing Championships. In the quarterfinals, he defeated Joseph Arguello of the United States by points, 29:11. In the semifinals, Tapia advanced over Adulallev Rashad (30:9) of Azerbaijan. In the finals, he faced Smolin Segey of Ukraine, defeating his with scores of 17:6 to win the gold medal. At his first major senior class tournament shortly after turning 17 years old, the 2007 World Amateur Boxing Championships, he was upset early at heavyweight with 201 lbs heavyweight limit by John M'Bumba of France, who went on to win the bronze medal. On October 8, 2009, Tapia participated in a youth dual against a selection from Canada, defeating Matt Flynn by abandonment in four rounds. On September 18, 2009, Tapia participated in a double-header against talent from the Ironbound Boxing Club based in Newark, New Jersey. His opponent was Lisandro Tupete, whom he outclassed throughout the contest to the point of at one time pinning him against the rope and almost pushing him out of the ring.

Tapia entered the Campeonato Nacional Issac Barrientos, held from January 29 to February 13, 2010. He debuted in the semifinals, winning by walk over when his scheduled opponent, Emilio Salas, forfeited the contest. In the finals, Tapia defeated José Santiago by points, leaving him scoreless with scores of 11:0. On May 22, 2010, Tapia entered the first Copa Olímpica Internacional, winning the tournament over José Santiago by points in a rematch at the final. On a single-night Puerto Rico national team meeting, Tapia won his scheduled contest with Michael Narváez by walk over. Tapia was meant to be part of the national team that participated in the 2010 Central American and Caribbean Games, but he was cut from it after choosing not to participate in morning running sessions and being absent from training. On July 3, 2011, he defeated Santiago (18:8) in a rubber match during the finals of the Copa Olímpica Internacional. Later that month, Tapia entered the Torneo Internacional José "Cheo" Aponte held in Caguas. In the semifinals, he was paired against Pan American champion Julio Castillo of Ecuador, overwhelming him in the third round and earning a RSC victory. In the finals he faced Santiago in another match, earning a 20:4 decision. Tapia decided to close his amateur career following a resolution where the Amateur Boxing Federation decided not to participate in the 2011 AIBA World Boxing Championships, citing an inexperienced team and conflicting dates with the 2011 Pan American Games, leaving him without a tournament to participate in. His final amateur record was 58 wins and four losses.

== Professional career ==
Tapia made his professional debut on November 18, 2011, defeating Andrew Kuilan in the undercard of a Promociones Miguel Cotto card held in San Juan, Puerto Rico. Less than three months later, he repeated that performance against Edgardo Salas in a televised Puerto Rico Best Boxing event. Twenty-one days later, Tapia returned in the undercard of a Universal Promotion's Team Puerto Rico event against Ramón Adorno, winning in the first round after his opponent's corner submitted the contest by throwing a towel into the ring. On March 24, 2012, he participated in his second Promociones Miguel Cotto event, finishing the contest in the same manner than those that preceded it.

Tapia faced Andrew Tabiti for the vacant NABF cruiserweight title at Sam's Town Hotel and Gambling Hall in Las Vegas on 13 May 2016, losing by unanimous decision.

He fought Mike Perez for the vacant WBA Fedelatin cruiserweight title at CFE Arena in Orlando, Florida, on 20 October 2018. Tapia lost by unanimous decision.

== Professional boxing record ==
20 fights	18 wins	2 losses
By knockout	11	0
By decision	7	2

No.	Result	Record	Opponent	Type	Round, time	Date	Location	Notes
20	Loss	18–2	(Cuba) Mike Perez	UD	10	Oct 20, 2018	(United States) CFE Arena, Orlando, Florida, U.S.	For vacant WBA Fedelatin cruiserweight title
19	Win	18–1	(Nigeria) Lateef Kayode	UD	10	Sep 23, 2017	(United States) Alamodome, San Antonio, Texas, U.S.	
18	Loss	17–1	(United States) Andrew Tabiti	UD	10	May 13, 2016	(United States) Sam's Town Hotel & Gambling Hall, Las Vegas, Nevada, U.S.	For vacant NABF cruiserweight title
17	Win	17–0	(United States) Garrett Wilson	UD	10	Dec 8, 2015	(United States) Sun National Bank Center, Trenton, New Jersey, U.S.	
16	Win	16–0	(United States) Anthony Caputo Smith	TKO	1 (8), 0:30	Sep 18, 2015	(United States) Claridge Hotel & Casino, Atlantic City, New Jersey, U.S.	
15	Win	15–0	(United States) Leo Pla	KO	8 (8), 2:42	May 29, 2015	(United States) Barclays Center, Brooklyn, New York, U.S.	
14	Win	14–0	(United States) Jason Smith	KO	1 (8), 2:21	Apr 24, 2015	(United States) UIC Pavilion, Chicago, Illinois, U.S.	
13	Win	13–0	(United States) Jesse Oltmanns	TKO	1 (8)	Jan 30, 2015	(United States) Foxwoods Resort, Mashantucket, Connecticut, U.S.	
12	Win	12–0	(United States) Paul Jennette	UD	8	Jun 7, 2014	(United States) Greensboro Coliseum, Greensboro, North Carolina, U.S.	
11	Win	11–0	(United States) Tobias Rice	TKO	5 (6), 2:53	May 17, 2014	(United States) PacPlex, Brooklyn, New York, U.S.	
10	Win	10–0	(United States) Earl Ladson	UD	6	Apr 6, 2014	(United States) The Ritz, Raleigh, North Carolina, U.S.	
9	Win	9–0	(United States) Rayford Johnson	UD	6	Nov 3, 2013	(United States) The Mansion, Atlanta, Georgia, U.S.	
8	Win	8–0	(United States) Derek Walker	TKO	3 (4), 2:40	Apr 13, 2013	(United States) The Inn at Greensboro Airport, Greensboro, North Carolina, U.S.	
7	Win	7–0	(United States) DJ Hughley	UD	4	Jan 19, 2013	(United States) Amos’ Southend, Charlotte, North Carolina, U.S.	
6	Win	6–0	(Mexico) Rafael Valenzuela	KO	1 (4), 2:29	Jan 4, 2013	(United States) Magic City Casino, Miami, Florida, U.S.	
5	Win	5–0	(United States) Juan Carlos Robles	UD	6	May 11, 2012	Miriam Segarra Coliseum, Penuelas, Puerto Rico	
4	Win	4–0	(Puerto Rico) Heriberto Lorenzo	TKO	1 (4), 1:14	Mar 24, 2012	Coliseo Roger L. Mendoza, Caguas, Puerto Rico	
3	Win	3–0	(Puerto Rico) Ramon Adorno	TKO	1 (4), 2:55	Feb 24, 2012	Coliseo Salvador Dijols, Ponce, Puerto Rico	
2	Win	2–0	(Puerto Rico) Emilio Salas	TKO	1 (4), 1:31	Feb 3, 2012	Coliseo Luis Aymat, San Sebastian, Puerto Rico	
1	Win	1–0	(Puerto Rico) Andrew Kuilan	TKO	1 (4), 1:50	Nov 18, 2011	Complejo Deportivo Nilmarie Santini, San Juan, Puerto Rico	Professional debut
