= Ruslan Fayfer =

Russian boxer (born 1991)

Personal information
- Born: 10 May 1991 (age 35) Ust-Barguzin, Russia
- Height: 6 ft 0 1/2 in (184 cm)
- Weight: Cruiserweight; Heavyweight

Boxing career
- Stance: Orthodox

Boxing record
- Total fights: 37
- Wins: 32
- Win by KO: 21
- Losses: 4
- Draws: 1
Medal record
Men's amateur boxing
Representing Russia
World University Championship
Gold medal – first place	2010 Ulaanbaatar	Light-heavyweight

Ruslan Vladimirovich Fayfer (Russian: Руслан Владимирович Файфер; born 10 May 1991) is a Russian professional boxer. At regional level, he held the Russian heavyweight title in 2015.

== Early life and education ==
Fayfer was born on 10 May 1991 in Siberian village Ust-Barguzin. He was drawn to the sport as a small child after watching action films like Bloodsport starring Jean-Claude Van Damme. He dreamed of getting in the ring, but his hometown was too small to have a gym. However, at the age of nine he moved with his family to Dzhubga over 6500 miles away, where they found him a coach and he began his training.

After graduating from high school in Dzhubga, Fayfer studied at Irkutsk State University for five years.

== Amateur career ==
Fayfer won Russian junior championships in 2004 and 2005 as well as a gold medal in the light-heavyweight event at the 2010 World University Boxing Championships in the light-heavyweight division.

== Professional career ==
Fayfer made his professional debut on 30 August 2013, defeating Ukrainian rival Roman Mirzoev via unanimous decision (UD) in Blagoveshchenskaya, Russia. Two years later, in July 2015, he took the Russian heavyweight title from prospect Vladimir Goncharov by way of majority decision (MD) in Moscow, giving the previously-undefeated fighter his first loss.

For his next fight, he matched up against Argentine veteran Cesar David Crenz in Saint Petersburg on 25 March 2017 for the vacant IBF International cruiserweight title. Fayfer took him down with a left hook to the chin in the first round, and finished him with a liver shot in the second to win the belt. He then stopped Ugandan contender David Basajjamivule in the fourth round of his first title defense that June, also picking up the vacant WBA Asia cruiserweight title in the process. He had three consecutive non-title victories, including one in August 2017 over American Junior Wright for the #2 spot in the IBF rankings. Fayfer suffered his first career defeat on 13 October 2018, losing by unanimous decision (116–111, 115–112, 114–113) to Andrew Tabiti in the cruiserweight quarter-finals of the 2018–19 World Boxing Super Series.

Fayfer faced undefeated compatriot Yury Kashinsky on 30 November 2019 in an IBF title eliminator where Kashinsky's EBP cruiserweight title was also on the line, winning by unanimous decision (115–111, 115–111, 114–112) to earn a future world title bout against Yunier Dorticos.

== Personal life ==
Fayfer now lives and trains in Krasnodar.

== Professional boxing record ==
37 fights	32 wins	4 losses
By knockout	21	3
By decision	11	1
Draws	1	

No.	Result	Record	Opponent	Type	Round, time	Date	Location	Notes
37	Win	32–4–1	Makhmadrazhab Sharipov	TKO	2 (8), 1:37	18 Apr 2025	Sports Center, Tambov, Russia	
36	Win	31–4–1	Dickson Mwakisopile	TKO	1 (8), 2:18	22 Jan 2025	Krasnodar, Russia	
35	Win	30–4–1	Seyedsina Ghalehbandi	UD	8	10 Jun 2024	Soviet Wings Sport Palace, Moscow, Russia	
34	Win	29–4–1	Alexander Zubkov	TKO	2 (6), 2:51	8 Mar 2024	Yakub Koblev Sports Palace, Maykop, Russia	
33	Win	28–4–1	German Garcia Montes	SD	8	18 Mar 2023	The Agenda, Dubai, UAE	
32	Loss	27–4–1	Shigabudin Aliev	TKO	6 (10), 2:18	31 Mar 2022	Basket Hall, Krasnodar, Russia	
31	Draw	27–3–1	Shigabudin Aliev	SD	10	30 Oct 2021	Usadba Familiya, Plastunovskaya, Russia	
30	Win	27–3	Fabio Maldonado	TKO	1 (10), 2:08	25 Jun 2021	WOW Arena, Krasnaya Polyana, Russia	
29	Win	26–3	Igor Vilchitsky	KO	1 (6), 1:23	1 Apr 2021	Basket Hall, Krasnodar, Russia	
28	Loss	25–3	Ali Izmailov	TKO	9 (10), 2:42	20 Nov 2020	Falcon Club, Minsk, Belarus	
27	Loss	25–2	Alexei Papin	TKO	6 (12), 0:36	22 Aug 2020	Pyramide, Kazan, Russia	
26	Win	25–1	Yury Kashinsky	UD	12	30 Nov 2019	Yakub Koblev Sports Palace, Maykop, Russia	Won EBP cruiserweight title
25	Win	24–1	Serhiy Radchenko	UD	10	19 May 2019	Cortesia, Krasnodar, Russia	
24	Loss	23–1	Andrew Tabiti	UD	12	13 Oct 2018	Ekaterinburg Expo, Ekaterinburg, Russia	World Boxing Super Series: cruiserweight quarter-final
23	Win	23–0	Emmanuel Danso	TKO	4 (10), 1:25	9 Jun 2018	Olimp, Krasnodar, Russia	
22	Win	22–0	Isaac Paakwesi Ankrah	KO	2 (10), 1:23	3 Nov 2017	Trade Union Sport Palace Nagorny, Nizhny Novgorod, Russia	
21	Win	21–0	Junior Anthony Wright	UD	12	18 Aug 2017	Usadba Familiya, Plastunovskaya, Russia	
20	Win	20–0	David Basajjamivule	TKO	4 (12), 1:20	10 Jun 2017	Floyd Mayweather Boxing Academy, Zhukovka, Russia	Retained IBF International cruiserweight title; Won vacant WBA Asia cruiserweight title
19	Win	19–0	Cesar David Crenz	TKO	2 (12), 2:27	25 Mar 2017	Qin Shi Huang Restaurant, Saint Petersburg, Russia	Won vacant IBF International cruiserweight title
18	Win	18–0	Fulgencio Zúñiga	KO	1 (8)	12 Nov 2016	Palais des sports René-Bougnol, Montpellier, France	
17	Win	17–0	Andrei Kniazev	UD	8	23 Sep 2016	Olimp, Krasnodar, Russia	
16	Win	16–0	Zoltan Csala	KO	2 (8), 2:23	31 Jul 2016	Arēna Rīga, Riga, Latvia	
15	Win	15–0	Gilberto Matheus Domingos	KO	2 (8), 0:19	6 May 2016	Gymnase du Lycée Technique de Monaco, Monte Carlo, Monaco	
14	Win	14–0	Oleksandr Nesterenko	KO	1 (10), 2:45	21 Feb 2016	Cosmos Hall, Moscow, Russia	
13	Win	13–0	Olegs Lopajevs	KO	1 (8), 1:17	5 Feb 2016	Gymnase du Lycée Technique de Monaco, Monte Carlo, Monaco	
12	Win	12–0	Sherzod Mamajonov	TKO	4 (10), 0:57	18 Jan 2016	Volta Club, Moscow, Russia	
11	Win	11–0	Avaz Rustamov	TKO	2 (10), 1:06	23 Dec 2015	Volta Club, Moscow, Russia	
10	Win	10–0	Aziz Billaev	TKO	3 (10), 0:37	10 Aug 2015	Pervomayskoye, Russia	
9	Win	9–0	Vladimir Goncharov	MD	10	19 Jul 2015	Volta Club, Moscow, Russia	Won Russian heavyweight title
8	Win	8–0	Edgars Kalnārs	RTD	1 (10), 3:00	25 Jun 2015	Volta Club, Moscow, Russia	
7	Win	7–0	Farrukh Madaminov	TKO	2 (10), 1:11	25 May 2015	Volta Club, Moscow, Russia	
6	Win	6–0	Emin Gulmammadov	TKO	5 (6), 2:45	22 Apr 2015	Volta Club, Moscow, Russia	
5	Win	5–0	Sergey Beloshapkin	UD	8	25 Jan 2015	Basket Hall, Krasnodar, Russia	
4	Win	4–0	Yuri Barashian	UD	8	26 Sep 2014	Basket Hall, Krasnodar, Russia	Won vacant WBC Baltic Silver cruiserweight title
3	Win	3–0	Ibragim Khalilov	UD	6	18 Apr 2014	Basket Hall, Krasnodar, Russia	
2	Win	2–0	Valentyn Trostyanchuk	KO	2 (4), 1:45	4 Nov 2013	Basket Hall, Krasnodar, Russia	
1	Win	1–0	Roman Mirzoev	UD	4	30 Aug 2013	Laskovyy Bereg, Blagoveshchenskaya, Russia	
