= Krzysztof Głowacki =

Polish boxer and mixed martial artist (born 1986)

- Born: July 31, 1986 (age 40); Wałcz, Polish People's Republic
- Other names: Główka
- Nationality: Polish
- Height: 1.83 m (6 ft 0 in)
- Division: Cruiserweight
- Reach: 191 cm (75 in)
- Style: Boxing

Professional boxing record
- Total: 36
- Wins: 32
- By knockout: 20
- Losses: 4

Mixed martial arts record
- Total: 6
- Wins: 3
- By knockout: 3
- Losses: 2
- By submission: 1
- By decision: 1
- No contests: 1

Other information
- Boxing record from BoxRec
- Mixed martial arts record from Sherdog

Krzysztof Głowacki (born 31 July 1986) is a Polish professional mixed martial artist and professional boxer. As a boxer he held the WBO junior-heavyweight title twice; from 2015 to 2016 and again in 2019 (elevated from interim champion). As an amateur, he won a bronze medal in the super-heavyweight division at the 2008 EU Championships.

== Early life ==
Krzysztof Głowacki was born in Walcz, north west Poland in 1986. Glowacki first started training aikido and karate in the club Orzel Walcz, before finally deciding to pursue a career in boxing. He started boxing at the age of 13, in 1999. He idolized Mike Tyson. Glowacki became a father at the age of 18, and, after finishing high school realized that he needed to support his family, so he gave up on studying and took up boxing full-time.

== Amateur career ==
Głowacki fought 125 amateur fights (103 Wins, 19 Losses and 3 Draws). He became Polish Junior Champion in 2003, 2004 and 2005. In 2007, he finished as runner-up in the Polish Senior Championships in the Super heavyweight category. The following year, he finished as a bronze medalist.

== Professional career ==
=== Early career ===
He made his debut in 2008, defeating Mariusz Radziszewski by points decision. In 2009, Głowacki won vacant Baltic Boxing Union International title, defeating Łukasz Rusiewicz by points decision.

On 18 August 2012, he won the vacant WBO Inter-Continental cruiserweight title, defeating Felipe Romero by sixth-round technical knockout (TKO).

On 31 January 2015, Głowacki won WBO European cruiserweight title by unanimous decision (118–110, 118–110 and 120–108) against Nuri Seferi (36–6, 20 KOs) at Torun, Poland. The bout was as also a WBO cruiserweight title eliminator.

=== WBO Cruiserweight Champion ===
==== Głowacki vs. Huck ====
On 14 August 2015, Głowacki won the WBO cruiserweight title, defeating Marco Huck (38–2–1, 26 KOs) by eleventh-round knockout. Huck dropped Głowacki with a huge left hand in the sixth round, Głowacki staggered to his feet and threw back everything he had, rocking Huck in the process. Coming into the eleventh round Huck was ahead on the scorecards, Głowacki knocked down Huck with a left-right combination. As the referee allowed the bout to continue, Głowacki landing two huge right hands and dropped Huck down against the ropes, the referee come in and waved off the bout. Glowacki twice dropped Marco Huck in a knockout that foiled Huck's attempt at a record 14th defense in the 200-pound division at the Prudential Center in Newark, New Jersey. Like Huck, it was Glowacki's first fight outside of Europe. Many consider this as the 2015 fight of the year.

==== Głowacki vs. Cunningham ====
On 16 April 2016, he defended the WBO cruiserweight title by unanimous decision (116–108, 115–109, 115–109) against Steve Cunningham. Cunningham was down twice in the second-round and once in tenth and twelfth.

==== Głowacki vs. Usyk ====
Głowacki lost the WBO cruiserweight championship against undefeated Ukrainian boxer Oleksandr Usyk (9–0, 9 KOs) on 17 September 2016 at the Ergo Arena in Gdańsk, Poland. The fight was shown live on Sky Sports in the UK. On the night, Usyk outpointed Głowacki after an exciting twelve-round fight with the judges scoring it 119–109, 117–111, and 117–111 all in Usyk's favour.

=== 2018–2019 : World Boxing Super Series ===
Krzysztof Głowacki entered the second edition of the World Boxing Super Series, with the winner from each weight division taking the Muhammad Ali Trophy, named after the former heavyweight champion Muhammad Ali, and a share of a grand prize.

==== Głowacki vs. Vlasov ====
On 10 November 2018 Głowacki won the vacant WBO interim title by unanimous decision (118–110, 117–110, 115–112) against Maxim Vlasov (42–2, 25 KOs) in the World Boxing Super Series cruiserweight quarter-final. Głowacki knocked Vlasov down in the third-round of the bout. The fight took place at the UIC Pavilion in Chicago, United States.

==== Glowacki vs. Briedis ====
On 6 February 2019 it was announced that Glowacki would challenge Latvia's Mairis Briedis (25–1, 18KOs) to defend the WBO interim title and their quest for the Ali Trophy in the cruiserweight division semi-final on 15 June at the Arena Riga in Riga, Latvia. On 4 June the WBC made Oleksandr Usyk 'champion in recess', which freed up the vacant WBC cruiserweight title to be on the line for the Briedis vs. Glowacki fight. On 5 June, after Usyk moved up to heavyweight, the WBO made Krzysztof Glowacki their new cruiserweight champion.

On 15 June 2019 in Riga he lost in third-round by TKO to Briedis. The fight raised a lot of controversy at the end of the second-round when, during a clinch, Glowacki punched Briedis in the back of the head. Briedis responded with an elbow to Glowacki's jaw. Glowacki fell down but was able to stand up and referee Robert Byrd continued the fight. Next the referee didn't hear the bell and Glowacki was punched by Briedis which was scored as a knockdown for Briedis. During the bout after the bell, which was not heard by a referee, some of the Briedis' crew entered the ring.

=== 2021 ===
==== Głowacki vs. Okolie ====
At the WBO federation convention in Tokyo, Japan, it was decided that Głowacki would face Lawrence Okolie for the vacant WBO cruiserweight title. The fight took place at the SSE Arena, Wembley in London, England on 20 March 2021. Okolie won by stoppage in the sixth-round to hand Głowacki his third defeat.

=== 2022 ===
==== Głowacki vs. Francisco Rivas Ruiz ====
Głowacki won in a bout against Francisco Rivas Ruiz, via TKO.

=== 2023 ===
==== Głowacki vs. Richard Riakporhe ====
Głowacki lost in a bout against British boxer Richard Riakporhe, via TKO. This bout was on the undercard of Chris Eubank Jr. vs. Liam Smith, held in the Manchester Arena in Manchester, England, on the 21 January 2023. Almost a year after the bout it was announced that Głowacki tested positive for boldenone in the bout's urine sample, and was banned from any competition overseen by UKAD for four years.

== Mixed martial arts career ==
Głowacki made his mixed martial arts debut against Patryk Tołkaczewski on 3 June 2023 at XTB KSW 83: Colosseum 2. He won the bout via knockout in the first round after hitting Tołkaczewsk with left hook while being mounted which knocked Tołkaczewsk out.

At the end of July 2024, it was announced that Głowacki would face former kickboxer Dawid Kasperski on September 14 at KSW 98: Paczuski vs. Zerhouni in Lubin. Głowacki lost unanimously on the scorecards.

== Professional boxing record ==
36 fights	32 wins	4 losses
By knockout	20	3
By decision	12	1

No.	Result	Record	Opponent	Type	Round, time	Date	Location	Notes
36	Loss	32–4	Richard Riakporhe	TKO	4 (12), 2:44	21 Jan 2023	Manchester Arena, Manchester, England	
35	Win	32–3	Francisco Rivas Ruiz	TKO	4 (10), 1:43	30 Apr 2022	Hala Sportowa, Wałcz, Poland	
34	Loss	31–3	Lawrence Okolie	TKO	6 (12), 0:46	20 Mar 2021	The SSE Arena, London England	For vacant WBO cruiserweight title
33	Loss	31–2	Mairis Briedis	TKO	3 (12), 0:27	15 Jun 2019	Arēna Rīga, Riga, Latvia	Lost WBO cruiserweight title World Boxing Super Series: cruiserweight semi-final
32	Win	31–1	Maxim Vlasov	UD	12	10 Nov 2018	UIC Pavilion, Chicago, Illinois, US	Won vacant WBO interim cruiserweight title; World Boxing Super Series: cruiserweight quarter-final
31	Win	30–1	Santander Silgado	KO	1 (10), 1:50	12 May 2018	Hala Sportowa MOSiR, Wałcz, Poland	
30	Win	29–1	Serhiy Radchenko	UD	8	10 Feb 2018	Nysa Hall, Nysa, Poland	
29	Win	28–1	Leonardo Bruzzese	KO	5 (10), 0:02	30 Sep 2017	Arēna Rīga, Riga, Latvia	
28	Win	27–1	Hizni Altunkaya	TKO	6 (10), 0:02	24 Jun 2017	Ergo Arena, Gdańsk, Poland	
27	Loss	26–1	Oleksandr Usyk	UD	12	17 Sep 2016	Ergo Arena, Gdańsk, Poland	Lost WBO cruiserweight title
26	Win	26–0	Steve Cunningham	UD	12	16 Apr 2016	Barclays Center, New York City, New York, US	Retained WBO cruiserweight title
25	Win	25–0	Marco Huck	KO	11 (12), 2:39	14 Aug 2015	Prudential Center, Newark, New Jersey, US	Won WBO cruiserweight title
24	Win	24–0	Nuri Seferi	UD	12	18 Jan 2015	Arena Toruń, Toruń, Poland	Won WBO European cruiserweight title
23	Win	23–0	Thierry Karl	KO	5 (12), 2:37	18 Oct 2014	NOSiR, Nowy Dwór Mazowiecki, Poland	Retained WBO Inter-Continental cruiserweight title
22	Win	22–0	Ismail Abdoul	UD	8	28 Jun 2014	Podpromie Hall, Rzeszów, Poland	
21	Win	21–0	Varol Vekiloglu	TKO	9 (12), 2:21	14 Dec 2013	Hala Sportowa MOSiR, Wałcz, Poland	Retained WBO Inter-Continental cruiserweight title
20	Win	20–0	Richard Hall	TKO	4 (8)	19 Oct 2013	Salt Mine, Wieliczka, Poland	
19	Win	19–0	Taylor Mabika	UD	8	20 Apr 2013	Podpromie Hall, Rzeszów, Poland	
18	Win	18–0	Matty Askin	KO	11 (12), 1:16	17 Nov 2012	Hilton Hotel and Convention Centre, Warsaw, Poland	Retained WBO Inter-Continental cruiserweight title
17	Win	17–0	Felipe Romero	TKO	6 (12), 2:59	18 Aug 2012	Amphitheatre, Międzyzdroje, Poland	Retained Poland International cruiserweight title; Won vacant WBO Inter-Continental cruiserweight title
16	Win	16–0	Ismail Abdoul	UD	6	17 Mar 2012	Hala Lodowa MOSiR, Krynica Zdrój, Poland	
15	Win	15–0	Konstantin Semerdjiev	TKO	2 (6), 0:41	3 Dec 2011	Hilton Hotel and Convention Centre, Warsaw, Poland	
14	Win	14–0	Paata Berikashvili	RTD	6 (6)	14 Oct 2011	Salt Mine, Wieliczka, Poland	
13	Win	13–0	Roman Kracik	TKO	9 (10), 2:15	18 Aug 2011	Amphitheatre, Międzyzdroje, Poland	Won vacant Poland International cruiserweight title
12	Win	12–0	Levan Jomardashvili	RTD	3 (6), 3:00	2 Apr 2011	Łuczniczka, Bydgoszcz, Poland	
11	Win	11–0	Patrick Berger	TKO	3 (6), 0:59	12 Jun 2010	Hala Lodowa MOSiR, Krynica Zdrój, Poland	
10	Win	10–0	Remigijus Ziausys	UD	6	7 Mar 2010	Hilton Hotel and Convention Centre, Warsaw, Poland	
9	Win	9–0	Jonathan Pasi	TKO	3 (6), 1:38	6 Feb 2010	Podpromie Hall, Rzeszów, Poland	
8	Win	8–0	Josip Jelušić	TKO	3 (6), 1:37	20 Dec 2009	Hala Sportowa OSiR, Grodzisk Mazowiecki, Poland	
7	Win	7–0	Łukasz Rusiewicz	PTS	6	20 Sep 2009	Hala ICSiR, Józefów, Poland	Won vacant BBU International cruiserweight title
6	Win	6–0	Kaspars Ozoliņš	KO	1 (4), 3:00	18 Aug 2009	Amphitheatre, Międzyzdroje, Poland	
5	Win	5–0	Jevgenijs Andrejevs	PTS	4	31 May 2009	Centrum Sportu i Rekreacji, Warka, Poland	
4	Win	4–0	Anton Lascek	KO	1 (4), 1:23	14 Dec 2008	Hala Włókniarza, Białystok, Poland	
3	Win	3–0	Dariusz Balla	TKO	2 (4), 1:20	7 Nov 2008	Salt Mine, Wieliczka, Poland	
2	Win	2–0	Klaids Kristapsons	UD	4	26 Oct 2008	Hala Sportowa AON, Rembertów, Poland	
1	Win	1–0	Mariusz Radziszewski	PTS	6	3 Oct 2008	Hotel "U Pietrzaków", Zielonka, Poland	

== Mixed martial arts record ==
Professional record breakdown
7 matches	3 wins	2 losses
By knockout	3	0
By submission	0	1
By decision	0	1
No contests	2	

Res.	Record	Opponent	Method	Event	Date	Round	Time	Location	Notes
Win	3–2 (2)	Callyugibrainn de Oliveira	TKO (leg kick)	Babilon MMA 60	September 26, 2026	1	2:42	Skierniewice, Poland	
NC	2–2 (2)	Damian Kostrzewa	NC (accidental punch to back of head)	Babilon MMA 59	July 24, 2026	2	0:48	Międzyzdroje, Poland	Accidental punch to back of head rendered Kostrzewa unable to continue.
Win	2–2 (1)	Kleber Silva	TKO (arm injury)	Babilon MMA 56	January 31, 2026	2	1:07	Żyrardów, Poland	
Loss	1–2 (1)	Jordan Nandor	Technical Submission (guillotine choke)	Babilon MMA 55	November 21, 2025	1	0:23	Radom, Poland	
NC	1–1 (1)	Jordan Nandor	NC (accidental eye poke)	KSW 104	March 8, 2025	1	0:20	Gorzów Wielkopolski, Poland	Accidental eye poke rendered Głowacki unable to continue.
Loss	1–1	Dawid Kasperski	Decision (unanimous)	KSW 98	September 14, 2024	3	5:00	Lubin, Poland	Light Heavyweight debut.
Win	1–0	Patryk Tołkaczewski	KO (punch)	KSW 83	June 3, 2023	1	1:33	Warsaw, Poland	Heavyweight debut. Knockout of the Night.

Sporting positions
Regional boxing titles
Vacant Title last held by Wojciech Bartnik	Poland International cruiserweight champion 18 August 2011 – April 2018; Vacated	Vacant Title next held by Adam Balski
Vacant Title last held by Kai Kurzawa	WBO Inter-Continental cruiserweight champion 18 August 2012 – December 2014; Vacated	Vacant Title next held by Oleksandr Usyk
Vacant Title last held by Nuri Seferi	WBO European cruiserweight champion 31 January 2015 – 14 August 2015; Won world title	Vacant Title next held by Damir Beljo
World boxing titles
Preceded by Marco Huck	WBO cruiserweight champion 14 August 2015 – 17 September 2016	Succeeded by Oleksandr Usyk
Vacant Title last held by Ola Afolabi	WBO cruiserweight champion Interim title 10 November 2018 – 5 June 2019; Promoted to full champion	Vacant
Vacant Title last held by Oleksandr Usyk	WBO cruiserweight champion 5 June 2019 – 15 June 2019	Succeeded by Mairis Briedis
Awards
Inaugural award	PBC Fight of the Year vs. Marco Huck; 2015	Next: Keith Thurman vs. Shawn Porter
Previous: Tommy Coyle vs. Daniel Brizuela; Round 11	ESPN Round of the Year vs. Marco Huck; Round 6; 2015	Next: Dillian Whyte vs. Derek Chisora; Round 5
