= Andrew Tabiti =

American boxer

Personal information
- Nicknames: The Beast; Tunde
- Born: Omotunde Andrew Tabiti; September 20, 1989 (age 37) Chicago, Illinois, U.S.
- Height: 6 ft 1 in (185 cm)
- Weight: Cruiserweight Heavyweight

Boxing career
- Reach: 76 1/2 in (194 cm)
- Stance: Orthodox

Boxing record
- Total fights: 22
- Wins: 20
- Win by KO: 16
- Losses: 2

Omotunde Tabiti (born September 20, 1989), better known as Andrew Tabiti, is an American professional boxer. He challenged once for the vacant IBF cruiserweight title in June 2019. As of February 2021, he is ranked as the world's fifth-best active cruiserweight by The Ring magazine.

== Professional career ==
Tabiti made his professional debut on July 19, 2013, stopping Andrew Howk in the first round. He trains out of the Mayweather Boxing Club in Las Vegas and is trained by Floyd Mayweather Sr., Jeff Mayweather and Otis Pimpleton.

Tabiti possesses extraordinary speed and reflexes along with his explosive punching-power, this is notably unusual for a fighter of his size.

He won the NABF cruiserweight title in May 2016 after decisioning Keith Tapia.

In February 2017, he retained the NABF cruiserweight title by stopping Quantis Graves via corner stoppage in Temecula, California.

He retained the NABF cruiserweight title and won the USBA cruiserweight title in August 2017.

=== 2018-19 World Boxing Super Series ===
==== Tabiti vs. Fayfer ====
On October 13, 2018, Tabiti, ranked #3 by the IBF and #5 by the WBC, fought Ruslan Fayfer, ranked #2 by the IBF, #5 by the WBA, #10 by the WBO and #15 by the WBC as a part of the WBSS cruiserweight quarter-final. Tabiti won on all three scorecards, 114–113, 115–112 and 116–111 to advance to the WBSS semi-finals.

==== Tabiti vs. Dorticos ====
On June 15, 2019, Tabiti, ranked #1 by the IBF, #2 by the WBA and WBC and #6 by the WBO fought Yuniel Dorticos who was ranked #1 by the WBA and #3 by the WBC, IBF and WBO at cruiserweight in the semi-finals of the WBSS, with the vacant IBF cruiserweight title on the line. In the tenth round, Dorticos scored a vicious knockout over Tabiti, catching him with a perfectly placed right hand to end the bout immediately.

== Professional boxing record ==
| 24 fights | 22 wins | 2 losses |
|---|---|---|
| By knockout | 18 | 1 |
| By decision | 4 | 1 |

| No. | Result | Record | Opponent | Type | Round, Time | Date | Location | Notes |
|---|---|---|---|---|---|---|---|---|
| 24 | Win | 22–2 | Jacob Dickson | KO | 4 (10) 1:34 | 13 Jun 2025 | Bukom Boxing Arena, Accra, Ghana | Won vacant WBC Africa bridgerweight title |
| 23 | Win | 21–2 | Junior Anthony Wright | TKO | 1 (10) 2:29 | 27 Apr 2024 | Liacouras Center, Philadelphia, Pennsylvania, U.S. | |
| 22 | Loss | 20–2 | Justis Huni | UD | 10 | 28 Oct 2023 | Poliforum Benito Juarez, Cancun, Mexico | For vacant WBA International heavyweight title |
| 21 | Win | 20–1 | James Wilson | RTD | 5 (8), 3:00 | 20 Aug 2022 | Jeddah Superdome, Jeddah, Saudi Arabia | |
| 20 | Win | 19–1 | Shamarian Snider | TKO | 2 (10), 1:33 | 21 May 2022 | Davies Boxing and Fitness, New York City, New York, U.S. | |
| 19 | Win | 18–1 | Mitch Williams | KO | 5 (10), 0:23 | 11 Dec 2021 | Dignity Health Sports Park, Carson, California, U.S. | |
| 18 | Loss | 17–1 | Yuniel Dorticos | KO | 10 (12), 2:33 | 15 Jun 2019 | Arēna Rīga, Riga, Latvia | For vacant IBF cruiserweight title; World Boxing Super Series: cruiserweight semi-final |
| 17 | Win | 17–0 | Ruslan Fayfer | UD | 12 | 13 Oct 2018 | Ekaterinburg Expo, Ekaterinburg, Russia | World Boxing Super Series: cruiserweight quarter-final |
| 16 | Win | 16–0 | Lateef Kayode | KO | 6 (10), 2:05 | 11 May 2018 | Sam's Town Hotel & Gambling Hall, Paradise, Nevada, U.S. | |
| 15 | Win | 15–0 | Steve Cunningham | UD | 10 | 26 Aug 2017 | T-Mobile Arena, Paradise, Nevada, U.S. | Retained NABF cruiserweight title Won vacant USBA cruiserweight title |
| 14 | Win | 14–0 | Quantis Graves | RTD | 6 (10), 3:00 | 24 Feb 2017 | Pechanga Resort & Casino, Temecula, California, U.S. | Retained NABF cruiserweight title |
| 13 | Win | 13–0 | Keith Tapia | UD | 10 | 13 May 2016 | Sam's Town Hotel & Gambling Hall, Paradise, Nevada, U.S. | Won vacant NABF cruiserweight title |
| 12 | Win | 12–0 | Tamas Lodi | RTD | 2 (8), 3:00 | 29 Sep 2015 | Palms Casino and Resort, Paradise, Nevada, U.S. | |
| 11 | Win | 11–0 | Roberto Santos | UD | 8 | 25 Jul 2015 | Palms Casino and Resort, Paradise, Nevada, U.S. | |
| 10 | Win | 10–0 | Thomas Hanshaw | TKO | 2 (8), 2:00 | 21 Jun 2015 | MGM Grand Garden Arena, Paradise, Nevada, U.S. | |
| 9 | Win | 9–0 | Ernest Reyna | KO | 1 (6), 2:52 | 12 Dec 2014 | Alamodome, San Antonio, Texas, U.S. | |
| 8 | Win | 8–0 | Caleb Grummet | TKO | 6 (6), 2:01 | 13 Sep 2014 | MGM Grand Garden Arena, Paradise, Nevada, U.S. | |
| 7 | Win | 7–0 | Eric Cason | TKO | 3 (6), 2:18 | 30 Aug 2014 | Palms Casino and Resort, Paradise, Nevada, U.S. | |
| 6 | Win | 6–0 | John Shipman | TKO | 4 (6), 2:11 | 3 May 2014 | MGM Grand Garden Arena, Paradise, Nevada, U.S. | |
| 5 | Win | 5–0 | Dorian Hatcher | TKO | 1 (4), 1:29 | 28 Feb 2014 | Turning Stone Resort & Casino, Verona, New York, U.S. | |
| 4 | Win | 4–0 | Kenneth Gray | TKO | 2 (4), 1:10 | 24 Jan 2014 | Little Creek Casino Resort, Shelton, Washington, U.S. | |
| 3 | Win | 3–0 | Justin Davis | TKO | 1 (4), 2:30 | 6 Dec 2013 | Little Creek Casino Resort, Shelton, Washington, U.S. | |
| 2 | Win | 2–0 | Eric Slocum | TKO | 1 (4), 1:27 | 28 Oct 2013 | Sports House, Redwood City, California, U.S. | |
| 1 | Win | 1–0 | Andrew Howk | TKO | 1 (4), 0:42 | 19 Jul 2013 | The Joint, Paradise, Nevada, U.S. | |

== Personal life ==
Tabiti's parents are Nigerian.
