= Men's Full-Contact at WAKO World Championships 2007 Coimbra -86 kg =

The men's cruiserweight (86 kg/189.2 lbs) Full-Contact category at the W.A.K.O. World Championships 2007 in Coimbra was the third heaviest of the male Full-Contact tournaments involving eleven fighters from three continents (Europe, Asia and North America). Each of the matches was three rounds of two minutes each and were fought under Full-Contact rules.

As there were not enough men for a tournament designed for sixteen, five of the men received a bye through to the quarter final stage. The tournament gold medallist was Sergey Bogdan from Russia who defeated Sweden's Sadibou Sy by split decision in the final. Defeated semi finalists Mairis Briedis from Latvia and Sergio Goncalves from Portugal received bronze medals.

== Results ==
1st Round
(Poland) Bogumil Polonski
(Sweden) Sadibou Sy	D(2:1)
(Portugal) Sergio Goncalves	D(3:0)
(Turkey) Mehmet Özer
(India) Atul Ghule
(Croatia) Luka Kalmeta	KO

Quarter Finals
(Latvia) Mairis Briedis	D(3:0)
(Azerbaijan) Zaur Alakbarov
(Finland) Teppo Laine
(Sweden) Sadibou Sy	D(3:0)
(United States) Adam Mcdermid
(Portugal) Sergio Goncalves	D(2:1)
(Croatia) Luka Kalmeta
(Russia) Sergey Bogdan	D(3:0)

Semi Finals
(Latvia) Mairis Briedis
(Sweden) Sadibou Sy	D(2:1)
(Portugal) Sergio Goncalves
(Russia) Sergey Bogdan	D(3:0)

Final
(Sweden) Sadibou Sy
(Russia) Sergey Bogdan	D(2:1)

=== Key ===
Abbreviation	Meaning
D (3:0)	Decision (Unanimous)
D (2:1)	Decision (Split)
KO	Knockout

== See also ==
- List of WAKO Amateur World Championships
- List of WAKO Amateur European Championships
- List of male kickboxers
