= 2018–2020 World Boxing Super Series – cruiserweight division =

Boxing competition

The 2018–20 World Boxing Super Series – cruiserweight division was a World Boxing Super Series professional boxing tournament which took place between October 2018 and September 2020 in several countries. The Super Series featured eight top-rated cruiserweight boxers in a single-elimination tournament. The tournament was organized by Comosa AG.

This tournament was the second World Boxing Super Series held at cruiserweight, following the 2017–18 edition, which saw Oleksandr Usyk unify all four major world titles.

== Participants ==
Rating^{1}	Boxer	Record Before Tournament^{2}	Stance	Height	Age^{2}	World titles^{2}
1	Mairis Briedis (LAT)	24–1–0	Orthodox	1.86 m (6 ft 1 in)	January 13, 1985 (aged 33)	
4	Yuniel Dorticos (CUB)	22–1–0	Orthodox	1.91 m (6 ft 3 in)	March 11, 1986 (aged 32)	
3	Krzysztof Głowacki (POL)	30–1–0	Southpaw	1.83 m (6 ft 0 in)	July 31, 1986 (aged 32)	
N/A	Ruslan Fayfer (RUS)	23–0–0	Orthodox	1.84 m (6 ft 1/2 in)	May 10, 1991 (aged 27)	
6	Andrew Tabiti (USA)	16–0–0	Orthodox	1.83 m (6 ft 0 in)	September 20, 1989 (aged 29)	
5	Maxim Vlasov (RUS)	42–2–0	Orthodox	1.92 m (6 ft 3 1/2 in)	September 11, 1986 (aged 32)	
8	Mateusz Masternak (POL)	41–4–0	Orthodox	1.83 m (6 ft 0 in)	May 2, 1987 (aged 31)	
N/A	Noel Gevor (GER)	23–1–0	Orthodox	1.89 m (6 ft 2 1/2 in)	September 18, 1990 (aged 28)	

^1 Transnational Boxing Rankings Board rankings on 9 Oct 2018, the last archived rankings before the start of the cruiserweight tournament.
^2 Age, records, and titles listed as of the start of the tournament.

== Brackets ==
Quarter-finals
Mairis Briedis (LAT)	UD 12
Noel Gevor (GER)
Krzysztof Głowacki (POL)	UD 12
Maxim Vlasov (RUS)
Yuniel Dorticos (CUB)	UD 12
Mateusz Masternak (POL)
Ruslan Fayfer (RUS)
Andrew Tabiti (USA)	UD 12

Semi-finals
Mairis Briedis (LAT)	TKO 3
Krzysztof Głowacki (POL)
Yuniel Dorticos (CUB)	KO 10
Andrew Tabiti (USA)

Final
Mairis Briedis (LAT)	MD 12
Yuniel Dorticos (CUB)

== Quarter-finals ==
The quarterfinals were held from 13 October to 10 November 2018.

13 October 2018	Andrew Tabiti (United States)	UD 12	(Russia) Ruslan Fayfer	Expo, Ekaterinburg, Russia

20 October 2018	Yuniel Dorticos (Cuba)	UD 12	(Poland) Mateusz Masternak	CFE Arena, Orlando, FL, United States

10 November 2018	Mairis Briedis (Latvia)	UD 12	(Germany) Noel Gevor	UIC Pavilion, Chicago, Il, United States

10 November 2018	Krzysztof Głowacki (Poland)	UD 12	(Russia) Maxim Vlasov	UIC Pavilion, Chicago, Il, United States

== Semi-finals ==
Both semifinal fights were held on 15 June 2019, at Arēna Rīga, Riga, Latvia.

15 June 2019	Yuniel Dorticos (Cuba)	KO 10	(United States) Andrew Tabiti	Arēna Rīga, Riga, Latvia

15 June 2019	Mairis Briedis (Latvia)	TKO 3	(Poland) Krzysztof Głowacki	Arēna Rīga, Riga, Latvia

== Final ==
The final was originally scheduled for 21 March 2020, before being postponed to 16 May 2020 at Arēna Rīga, Riga, Latvia, the same place as the semi-finals, for the IBF and The Ring titles, but was postponed to 26 September 2020 at Plazamedia Broadcasting Center, Munich, Germany due to the COVID-19 pandemic and was played behind closed doors.

26 September 2020	Mairis Briedis (Latvia)	MD 12	(Cuba) Yuniel Dorticos	Plazamedia Broadcasting Center, Munich, Germany
