= Lateef Kayode =

Nigerian boxer (born 1983)

Personal information
- Nickname: Power
- Nationality: Nigerian
- Born: March 3, 1983 (age 43) Lagos, Nigeria
- Height: 6 ft 2 in (188 cm)
- Weight: Heavyweight; Cruiserweight

Boxing career
- Reach: 77 in (195 cm)
- Stance: Orthodox

Boxing record
- Total fights: 27
- Wins: 21
- Win by KO: 16
- Losses: 4
- No contests: 2

Lateef Olalekan Kayode (born March 3, 1983) is a Nigerian professional boxer who challenged for the WBA cruiserweight title in 2015.

== Early life ==
Lateef Olalalekin Kayode was born in Lagos, Nigeria.

== Professional career ==
On December 3, 2010 Kayode knocked out American Edward Charles Perry on a Showtime boxing card. Kayode showed a much more relaxed demeanor in the ring than in his previous ShoBox appearances. In the 6th round he perfectly placed a right hand down the pipe that connected on the left side of Perry’s jaw, sending him sprawling to the ground once more. Perry had never touched the canvas in 13 years as a professional.

On June 10, 2011, Kayode proved too much for Matt Godfrey at the Chumash Resort Casino. Kayode controlled the entire fight and sent Godfrey to the canvas a total of three times, eventually winning by scores of 98-90, 97-90, 98-89. He knocked Godfrey to the floor in rounds one, five and nine with a devastating display of body shots and power punches to the head. Kayode was brutally knocked out by Denis Lebedev in his last fight.

=== Professional boxing record ===
27 fights	21 wins	4 losses
By knockout	16	3
By decision	5	1
No contests	2	

Res.	Record	Opponent	Type	Rd., Time	Date	Location	Notes
Loss	21–4 (2)	Aleksey Egorov	RTD	6 (10)	2018-7-20	Florentine Gardens, El Monte	
Loss	21–3 (2)	Andrew Tabiti	KO	6 (10)	2018-5-11	Sam's Town Hotel & Gambling Hall, Las Vegas, Nevada	
Loss	21–2 (2)	Keith Tapia	UD	10	2017-09-23	Alamodome, San Antonio	Kayode down once in Round 6.
Loss	21–1 (2)	Denis Lebedev	TKO	8 (12)	2015-11-04	TatNeft Arena, Kazan	For WBA Cruiserweight title.
Win	21–0 (2)	Nick Kisner	UD	10	2015-05-29	Memphis, Tennessee	
NC	20–0 (2)	Luis Ortiz	NC	1 (12)	2014-09-11	Hard Rock Hotel and Casino, Las Vegas, Nevada	For interim WBA heavyweight title. TKO1 for Ortiz was overturned after Ortiz failed a drug test.
Win	20–0 (1)	Jonte Willis	TKO	6 (6)	2014-01-10	Emerald Queen Casino, Tacoma, Washington	
Win	19–0 (1)	Travis Fulton	TKO	2 (6)	2013-12-06	Chumash Casino, Santa Ynez, California	
NC	18–0 (1)	Antonio Tarver	NC	12	2012-03-06	Home Depot Centre, California	Retained WBA-NABA Cruiserweight Title. Originally a draw it was changed to a "no-contest" after Tarver failed a drug test
Win	18–0|	Felix Cora, Jr.	UD	10	2011-09-09	Grand Casino, Hinckley, Minnesota	Retained WBA-NABA cruiserweight title.
Win	17–0	Matt Godfrey	UD	10	2011-06-10	Chumash Casino, Santa Ynez, California	Won vacant WBA-NABA cruiserweight title; Retained WBC-NABF cruiserweight title.
Win	16–0	Nicholas Iannuzzi	UD	10	2011-02-04	Chumash Casino, Santa Ynez, California	Retained WBC-NABF and WBO-NABO cruiserweight titles.
Win	15–0	Ed Perry	KO	6 (10)	2010-12-03	Chumash Casino, Santa Ynez, California	Retained WBO-NABO cruiserweight title.
Win	14–0	Epifanio Mendoza	RTD	6 (10)	2010-10-15	Buffalo Run Casino, Miami, Oklahoma	Won vacant WBC-NABF cruiserweight title.
Win	13–0	Alfredo Escalera Jr.	TKO	8 (10)	2010-08-06	Grand Casino, Hinckley, Minnesota	Won vacant WBO-NABO cruiserweight title.
Win	12–0	Jose Luis Herrera	KO	2 (8)	2010-05-14	Chumash Casino, Santa Ynez, California	
Win	11–0	Chris Thomas	TKO	4 (8)	2010-03-27	Joe Louis Arena, Detroit, Michigan	
Win	10–0	Chris Thomas	KO	2 (8)	2010-02-05	Chumash Casino, Santa Ynez, California	
Win	9–0	Billy Willis	KO	2 (6)	2009-12-12	Agua Caliente Casino, Rancho Mirage, California	
Win	8–0	Leo Bercier	TKO	3 (6)	2009-08-29	Emerald Queen Casino, Tacoma, Washington	
Win	7–0	Francisco Mireles	KO	1 (6)	2009-06-12	Civic Auditorium, Glendale, California	
Win	6–0	Marcus Dickerson	KO	1 (6)	2009-04-30	Four Points Sheraton Hotel, San Diego, California	
Win	5–0	Ethan Cox	KO	2 (4)	2008-12-20	Hollywood Park Casino, Inglewood, California	
Win	4–0	Jamiah Williamson	TKO	2 (4)	2008-11-21	Quiet Cannon, Montebello, California	
Win	3–0	Octavius Davis	TKO	2 (4)	2008-10-03	Wicomico Civic Center, Salisbury, Maryland	
Win	2–0	Mike Finney	TKO	2 (4)	2008-09-05	Quiet Cannon, Montebello, California	
Win	1–0	Mike Miller	UD	4	2008-08-15	Ibiza Nightclub, Washington, District of Columbia	
