= Dorticos =

Dorticos or Dorticós is a surname. Notable people with the surname include:

- Osvaldo Dorticós Torrado (1919–1983), Cuban politician
- Yuniel Dorticos (born 1986), Cuban boxer
