= Maxim Vlasov =

Russian boxer (born 1986)

Personal information
- Nickname: The Kill
- Nationality: Russian
- Born: Maksim Sergeyevich Vlasov; 11 September 1986 (age 39) Kuybyshev, Russian SFSR, Soviet Union (now Samara, Russia)
- Height: 6 ft 3 in (191 cm)
- Weight: Middleweight; Super-middleweight; Light-heavyweight; Cruiserweight

Boxing career
- Reach: 75 in (191 cm)
- Stance: Orthodox

Boxing record
- Total fights: 51
- Wins: 46
- Win by KO: 26
- Losses: 5

Maxim Sergeyevich Vlasov (Russian: Максим Сергеевич Власов; born 11 September 1986) is a Russian professional boxer. He challenged for the WBO light-heavyweight title in 2021.

== Professional career ==
Vlasov defeated 2008 Olympic gold medalist and former IBO cruiserweight champion, Rakhim Chakhkiev, by seventh round technical knockout at Megasport Arena in Moscow, Russia, on 3 December 2016.

He faced Joe Smith Jr. for the vacant WBO light-heavyweight title at Osage Casino in Tulsa, Oklahoma, USA, on 10 April 2021, losing via majority decision with two of the ringside judges both scoring the fight 115–112 for his opponent, while the third had it a 114–114 draw.

== Professional boxing record ==
| 51 fights | 46 wins | 5 losses |
|---|---|---|
| By knockout | 26 | 1 |
| By decision | 20 | 4 |

| No. | Result | Record | Opponent | Type | Round, time | Date | Location | Notes |
|---|---|---|---|---|---|---|---|---|
| 51 | Loss | 46–5 | Dilmurod Satybaldiev | RTD | 6 (10), 3:00 | 27 May 2022 | Avangard Ice Hockey Academy, Omsk, Russia | |
| 50 | Win | 46–4 | Felix Valera | UD | 10 | 24 Dec 2021 | USC Soviet Wings, Moscow, Russia | |
| 49 | Loss | 45–4 | Joe Smith Jr. | MD | 12 | 10 Apr 2021 | Osage Casino, Tulsa, Oklahoma, U.S. | For vacant WBO light-heavyweight title |
| 48 | Win | 45–3 | Emmanuel Martey | UD | 10 | 30 Nov 2019 | Yakub Koblev Sports Palace, Maykop, Russia | |
| 47 | Win | 44–3 | Isaac Chilemba | UD | 12 | 20 Jul 2019 | Central Square, Gelendzhik, Russia | Won vacant EBP light-heavyweight title |
| 46 | Win | 43–3 | Omar Garcia | TKO | 4 (10), 1:09 | 19 May 2019 | Cortesia, Krasnodar, Russia | |
| 45 | Loss | 42–3 | Krzysztof Głowacki | UD | 12 | 10 Nov 2018 | UIC Pavilion, Chicago, Illinois, US | For vacant WBO interim cruiserweight title; World Boxing Super Series: cruiserweight quarter-final |
| 44 | Win | 42–2 | Olanrewaju Durodola | RTD | 10 (12), 3:00 | 3 Feb 2018 | Bolshoy Ice Dome, Sochi, Russia | Won vacant WBC Silver cruiserweight title |
| 43 | Win | 41–2 | Vikapita Meroro | KO | 1 (10), 2:58 | 21 Dec 2017 | Krylia Sovetov, Moscow, Russia | |
| 42 | Win | 40–2 | Denton Daley | TKO | 9 (12), 0:19 | 7 Sep 2017 | Kristall Ice Palace, Saratov, Russia | Won vacant WBA Continental (Europe) cruiserweight title |
| 41 | Win | 39–2 | Mussa Ajibu | TKO | 3 (10), 0:55 | 29 Jun 2017 | Korston Club, Moscow, Russia | |
| 40 | Win | 38–2 | Tamas Lodi | KO | 2 (10), 1:45 | 10 Mar 2017 | Circus Benidorm, Benidorm, Spain | |
| 39 | Win | 37–2 | Rakhim Chakhkiev | TKO | 7 (12), 0:17 | 3 Dec 2016 | Megasport Arena, Moscow, Russia | Won vacant WBA International cruiserweight title |
| 38 | Win | 36–2 | Carlos Ailton Nascimento | TKO | 3 (10), 2:12 | 14 Nov 2016 | Studio 69, Riga, Latvia | Won vacant IBO Inter-Continental cruiserweight title |
| 37 | Win | 35–2 | Ismail Sillakh | TKO | 3 (10), 0:23 | 2 Jun 2016 | Korston Club, Moscow, Russia | |
| 36 | Win | 34–2 | Yury Bykhautsou | UD | 10 | 29 Apr 2016 | Korston Club, Moscow, Russia | |
| 35 | Win | 33–2 | Nurullo Mirzaev | RTD | 1 (10), 3:00 | 21 Feb 2016 | Cosmos Hall, Moscow, Russia | |
| 34 | Win | 32–2 | Ilya Rolgeyzer | TKO | 1 (8), 1:38 | 23 Dec 2015 | Volta Club, Moscow, Russia | |
| 33 | Win | 31–2 | Gusmyr Perdomo | UD | 6 | 10 Oct 2015 | El Poliedro, Caracas, Venezuela | |
| 32 | Loss | 30–2 | Gilberto Ramírez | UD | 10 | 24 Jan 2015 | 1stBank Center, Broomfield, Colorado, US | |
| 31 | Win | 30–1 | Ruben Eduardo Acosta | KO | 7 (10), 1:43 | 26 Jul 2014 | Kipsala Exhibition Centre, Riga, Latvia | Won vacant WBC Baltic light-heavyweight title |
| 30 | Win | 29–1 | Derrick Findley | UD | 8 | 15 Mar 2014 | Performing Arts Center, Oxnard, California, US | |
| 29 | Win | 28–1 | Maxell Taylor | KO | 4 (8), 2:32 | 5 Dec 2013 | Orange County Fairgrounds, Costa Mesa, California, US | |
| 28 | Win | 27–1 | Artem Redko | TKO | 6 (10), 2:42 | 4 Nov 2013 | Basket Hall, Krasnodar, Russia | |
| 27 | Win | 26–1 | Mark Suarez | UD | 8 | 12 Jul 2013 | County Fairgrounds, Ventura, California, US | |
| 26 | Win | 25–1 | Geard Ajetovic | UD | 10 | 30 Dec 2012 | Sports Palace Quant, Moscow, Russia | |
| 25 | Win | 24–1 | Khoren Gevor | UD | 10 | 5 Nov 2012 | Sports Palace Quant, Moscow, Russia | Retained WBC Baltic super-middleweight title |
| 24 | Win | 23–1 | Bernard Donfack | UD | 10 | 16 Mar 2012 | Circus, Krasnodar, Russia | |
| 23 | Win | 22–1 | Roman Shkarupa | TKO | 3 (10), 2:15 | 12 Nov 2011 | Ahtme Sport Hall, Ahtme, Estonia | Won vacant WBC Baltic super-middleweight title |
| 22 | Win | 21–1 | Gasan Gasanov | RTD | 1 (8), 3:00 | 25 Sep 2011 | Olimp, Krasnodar, Russia | |
| 21 | Win | 20–1 | Gennady Maximov | UD | 8 | 1 Jul 2011 | Ambar, Tolyatti, Russia | |
| 20 | Loss | 19–1 | Isaac Chilemba | UD | 10 | 25 Feb 2011 | Million Dollar Elm Casino, Tulsa, Oklahoma, US | |
| 19 | Win | 19–0 | Mikhail Krinitsin | TKO | 7 (12), 2:54 | 18 Sep 2010 | Sport Palace "Uzbekiston", Tashkent, Uzbekistan | Won vacant WBC–ABCO super-middleweight title |
| 18 | Win | 18–0 | Jerson Ravelo | TKO | 3 (10), 1:12 | 18 Jun 2010 | Northern Quest Resort & Casino, Airway Heights, Washington, US | |
| 17 | Win | 17–0 | Vasyl Kondor | TKO | 3 (8), 2:39 | 27 Apr 2010 | Yubileiny Sports Palace, Saint Petersburg, Russia | |
| 16 | Win | 16–0 | Julius Fogle | KO | 1 (8), 2:42 | 12 Feb 2010 | Pechanga Resort & Casino, Temecula, California, US | |
| 15 | Win | 15–0 | Nodir Ikramov | RTD | 5 (8), 3:00 | 28 Nov 2009 | CSKA VVS Arena, Samara, Russia | |
| 14 | Win | 14–0 | Don Mouton | MD | 8 | 23 Oct 2008 | Northern Quest Resort & Casino, Airway Heights, Washington, US | |
| 13 | Win | 13–0 | Jonathan Reid | TKO | 4 (8), 1:22 | 22 Aug 2008 | Sommet Center, Nashville, Tennessee, US | |
| 12 | Win | 12–0 | Orlando Torres | TKO | 4 (8), 1:11 | 16 May 2008 | Thomas & Mack Center, Paradise, Nevada, US | |
| 11 | Win | 11–0 | Rodrigo Aguiar | TKO | 5 (8), 2:27 | 7 Mar 2008 | Foxwoods Resort Casino, Ledyard, Connecticut, US | |
| 10 | Win | 10–0 | Maksym Velychko | UD | 6 | 29 Nov 2007 | Ice Palace, Tyumen, Russia | |
| 9 | Win | 9–0 | Sam Haynes | KO | 3 (6), 2:32 | 16 Sep 2007 | Northern Quest Resort & Casino, Airway Heights, Washington, US | |
| 8 | Win | 8–0 | Alexander Pestenkov | UD | 6 | 3 Aug 2007 | Pyramide, Tolyatti, Russia | |
| 7 | Win | 7–0 | Rostyslav Kitun | UD | 6 | 26 Feb 2007 | Sports Palace Yubileiny, Almetyevsk, Russia | |
| 6 | Win | 6–0 | Artem Redko | UD | 6 | 13 Oct 2006 | Pyramide, Kazan, Russia | |
| 5 | Win | 5–0 | Kirill Khizhnyak | TKO | 5 (6), 1:02 | 18 Jun 2006 | Samara, Russia | |
| 4 | Win | 4–0 | Alexander Murashov | UD | 6 | 23 Dec 2005 | Akrobat, Tolyatti, Russia | |
| 3 | Win | 3–0 | Dmitry Melnikov | UD | 6 | 30 Oct 2005 | Samara, Russia | |
| 2 | Win | 2–0 | Vadim Graschenko | UD | 4 | 17 Jun 2005 | Pyramide, Tolyatti, Russia | |
| 1 | Win | 1–0 | Kirill Galuzin | UD | 4 | 21 Apr 2005 | Pyramide, Tolyatti, Russia | |
