= Mike Perez (boxer) =

Cuban boxer (born 1985)

Personal information
- Nickname: The Rebel
- Nationality: Cuban; Irish
- Born: Ismaikel Pérez; 20 October 1985 (age 41) Sancti Spíritus, Cuba
- Height: 6 ft 1 in (185 cm)
- Weight: Cruiserweight; Heavyweight

Boxing career
- Reach: 76 in (193 cm)
- Stance: Southpaw

Boxing record
- Total fights: 37
- Wins: 32
- Win by KO: 22
- Losses: 3
- Draws: 1
- No contests: 1
Medal record
Representing Cuba
World Junior Championships
Gold medal – first place	2004 Jeju	Light heavyweight

Ismaikel "Mike" Perez (born 20 October 1985) is a Cuban-Irish professional boxer. He has challenged once for the WBC cruiserweight title in 2017. At regional level, he has held multiple heavyweight and cruiserweight championships; and won the Prizefighter series in 2011.

== Background ==
Perez was a successful amateur boxer in Cuba. In 2005, while competing with the Cuban team at a tournament in Liverpool, he caught the eye of Irish boxing promoter Gary Hyde. Hyde later expressed his desire to turn Perez professional, and to do that he had to arrange his defection from Cuba. In December 2007, under cover of darkness, Perez swam offshore from Cuba, to a boat crewed by a Mexican cartel. After transferring through two other boats, enduring storms and depleted food and water supplies, Perez eventually reached Mexican soil nine days later. The Cartel then held him there, until they secured final payment from organizer, Gary Hyde. Upon receiving it, Perez was released, allowing him to board a flight to his new home. On 10 January 2008, Perez touched down in Ireland, where he settled in Cork along with fellow Cubans Alexei Acosta and Luis García. Today, he fights under the nickname Mike "The Rebel" Perez, in reference to Cork which is known as the "Rebel County".

== Amateur career ==
Perez had over 400 amateur bouts. In 2004, he won gold at the World Junior Championships in Jeju City, South Korea. The southpaw beat Englishman Danny Price in the semifinals, before defeating Russian fighter Nikolay Pavlyukov 38–16 in the final. Perez later beat fighters such as Kenneth Egan and Constantin Bejenaru, but moved up to 201 lbs and initially struggled against world class competition like Luis Ortiz, who beat him in 2006 to become the Cuban national champion. Perez avenged that loss in the 2007 championships, but lost to Osmay Acosta in that year's final.

== Professional career ==
=== Early career ===
In 2008, Perez turned professional under Cuban coach Nicholas Cruz Hernández, who had also moved to Ireland in 1988.

On 7 May 2011, Perez won the International Prizefighter tournament, held in London, England. Perez faced Kertson Manswell and Grégory Tony, before defeating American Tye Fields in the final to take home the £32,000 prize. After the fight, Perez stated the victory would earn him a world title shot in the near future.

He then fought and won against American journeyman Zack Page in a rematch on 9 November 2011, in York Hall, Bethnal Green, London.

Perez made his United States debut on 30 December 2011, against the Nigerian heavyweight Friday Ahunanya. The location for the fight was Morongo Casino, Resort & Spa, Cabazon, California. Perez won by unanimous decision, winning every round on the judges' scorecards.

After a hiatus in 2012, Perez returned to the ring on 4 May 2013, winning a 10-round unanimous decision against American Travis Walker on the undercard of Wladimir Klitschko vs. Francesco Pianeta.

=== Perez vs. Abdusalomov ===
On 2 November 2013, he made his HBO debut against hard-hitting prospect Magomed Abdusalomov (18–0 18 KOs) at Madison Square Garden. In a rare southpaw vs. southpaw heaveyweight match, Perez won by unanimous decision after a brutally-fought 10 rounds. The fight left Abdusalamov permanently and severely injured after suffering a stroke during surgery to remove a blood clot in his brain. Abdusalamov's family later sued the New York State Athletic Commission due to negligence. The lawsuit ended with a $22 million settlement. Perez's form dipped after the tragic incident, as he drew and lost many of his next fights. He would later reveal that he struggled with alcoholism during this time, to the point of getting into the ring drunk a few times.

=== Perez vs. Takam ===
Perez returned on 18 January 2014 to fight Carlos Takam at the Bell Centre in Montreal. Takam and Perez fought to a majority draw. The fight was shown on HBO on the Jean Pascal vs Lucian Bute under card.

=== Perez vs. Jennings ===
Perez then lost a narrow split decision to Bryant Jennings on 26 July 2014, with the judges’ scorecards reading 114–113 and 115–112 for Jennings, and 114–113 for Perez. Referee Harvey Dock controversially deducted a point from Perez in the final round for hitting Jennings on the break.

=== Perez vs. Povetkin ===
On 22 May 2015 Perez was brutally knocked out by Alexander Povetkin 91 seconds into a WBC heavyweight title eliminator. Following the loss to Povetkin, Perez spent over two years away from the ring, before returning in 2017 as a cruiserweight.

=== World Boxing Super Series ===
On 6 July, Perez was announced as the final entrant to the cruiserweight World Boxing Super Series (WBSS).

==== Perez vs. Briedis ====
At the Draft Gala, which took place on 8 July in Monte Carlo, Perez was chosen by WBC champion Mairis Briedis as his quarter final opponent. On 22 July, the WBSS announced the fight would take place in Briedis' home country of Latvia at the Riga Arena, Riga, on 30 September 2017. This would be the 8th time Briedis would fight at his hometown arena.

Briedis won a scrappy fight, beating Perez by unanimous decision after 12 rounds (116–110, 115–111, 114–112). Perez was deducted a point in round 3 following an accidental clash of heads. Briedis was also docked a point during round 10 for excessive holding. With the win, Briedis moved on to the semi-finals to face the eventual winner Oleksandr Usyk.

==== Perez vs. Tapia ====
Perez scored a unanimous decision win over Keith Tapia at CFE Arena in Orlando, Florida, on 20 October 2018. The fight was for the vacant WBA Fedelatin cruiserweight title and an alternate position in the World Boxing Super Series,

==== Perez vs. Salam ====
Perez fought Tony Salam for the vacant WBA Inter-Continental cruiserweight title at Atlantis The Palm in Dubai on 13 August 2021. He won the via third round technical knockout.

==== Perez vs. Ducar ====
On 26 March 2022, he made the first defense of the title against Vasil Ducar at Aviation Club Tennis Centre in Dubai. Perez retained the belt when his opponent retired at the end of the 10th round.

==== Perez vs. Ward ====
Having previously vacated the title, Perez retained the vacant WBA Intercontinental cruiserweight championship by stopping Steven Ward in the ninth round at Portman Road in Ipswich, England, on 7 June 2025.

==== Perez vs. Fabian Luis ====
On 8 August 2025, Perez fought Christian Fabian Luis in a 10-round contest at Benina Martyrs Stadium in Benghazi, Libya. The bout was ruled a no contest at the end of the fourth round when Perez landed an unintentional punch after the bell had sounded which left his opponent unable to continue.

==== Perez vs. Arinze ====
Perez defeated Franklin Arinze on points over eight rounds at Co-op Live in Manchester, England, on 9 May 2026.

== Personal life ==
Perez resides in Cork, Ireland with his wife Camille.

== Professional boxing record ==
37 fights	32 wins	3 losses
By knockout	22	1
By decision	10	2
Draws	1	
No contests	1	

No.	Result	Record	Opponent	Type	Round, time	Date	Location	Notes
37	Win	32–3–1 (1)	Franklin Arinze	PTS	8	9 May 2026	Co-op Live, Manchester, England	
36	NC	31–3–1 (1)	Christian Fabian Luis	NC	4 (10), 3:00	8 Aug 2025	Benina Martyrs Stadium, Benghazi, Libya	Perez connected an illegal unintentional blow after bell sounded which rendered Luis unable to continue
35	Win	31–3–1	Steven Ward	TKO	9 (10), 0:49	7 Jun 2025	Portman Road, Ipswich, England	Won vacant WBA Inter-Continental cruiserweight title
34	Win	30–3–1	Israel Duffus	TKO	1 (8), 0:34	15 Dec 2024	Europa Point Sports Complex, Gibraltar	
33	Win	29–3–1	Rashad Karimov	TKO	1 (8), 1:39	14 Oct 2023	Rudolf Weber-Arena, Oberhausen, Germany	
32	Win	28–3–1	Adnan Deronja	TKO	1 (8)	5 Aug 2023	Hotel Holiday World, Benalmádena, Spain	
31	Win	27–3–1	Vasil Ducar	RTD	10 (12), 3:00	26 Mar 2022	Aviation Club Tennis Centre, Dubai, UAE	Retained WBA Inter-Continental cruiserweight title
30	Win	26–3–1	Jose Gregorio Ulrich	TKO	6 (10), 0:53	13 Nov 2021	Classic Remise, Duesseldorf, Germany	
29	Win	25–3–1	Tony Salam	KO	4 (12), 2:13	13 Aug 2021	Atlantis The Palm, Dubai, UAE	Won vacant WBA Inter-Continental cruiserweight title
28	Win	24–3–1	Keith Tapia	UD	10	20 Oct 2018	CFE Arena, Orlando, Florida, U.S.	Won vacant WBA Fedelatin cruiserweight title
27	Win	23–3–1	Pablo Matias Magrini	TKO	1 (8), 0:30	17 Feb 2018	WIT Arena, Waterford, Ireland	
26	Loss	22–3–1	Mairis Briedis	UD	12	30 Sep 2017	Arena Riga, Riga, Latvia	For WBC cruiserweight title; World Boxing Super Series: cruiserweight quarter-finals
25	Win	22–2–1	Viktor Biscak	KO	1 (6), 0:29	10 Jun 2017	Odyssey Arena, Belfast, Northern Ireland	
24	Loss	21–2–1	Alexander Povetkin	KO	1 (12), 1:31	22 May 2015	Luzhniki Palace of Sports, Moscow, Russia	For WBC Silver heavyweight title
23	Win	21–1–1	Darnell Wilson	TKO	2 (8), 0:59	5 Feb 2015	The Hangar, Costa Mesa, California, U.S.	
22	Loss	20–1–1	Bryant Jennings	SD	12	26 Jul 2014	The Theater at Madison Square Garden, New York, New York, U.S.	
21	Draw	20–0–1	Carlos Takam	MD	10	18 Jan 2014	Bell Centre, Montreal, Quebec, Canada	Retained WBC–USNBC heavyweight title
20	Win	20–0	Magomed Abdusalamov	UD	10	2 Nov 2013	The Theater at Madison Square Garden, New York City, New York, U.S.	Won WBC–USNBC heavyweight title
19	Win	19–0	Travis Walker	UD	10	4 May 2013	SAP Arena, Mannheim, Germany	
18	Win	18–0	Friday Ahunanya	UD	10	30 Dec 2011	Morongo Casino, Resort & Spa, Cabazon, California, U.S.	
17	Win	17–0	Zack Page	PTS	8	9 Nov 2011	York Hall, London, England	
16	Win	16–0	Tye Fields	TKO	1 (3), 0:42	7 May 2011	Alexandra Palace, London, England	Prizefighter 18: The International Heavyweights – final
15	Win	15–0	Grégory Tony	TKO	1 (3), 0:54	7 May 2011	Alexandra Palace, London, England	Prizefighter 18: The International Heavyweights – semi-final
14	Win	14–0	Kertson Manswell	UD	3	7 May 2011	Alexandra Palace, London, England	Prizefighter 18: The International Heavyweights – quarter-final
13	Win	13–0	Ismail Abdoul	PTS	8	4 Mar 2011	Doncaster Dome, Doncaster, England	
12	Win	12–0	Pāvels Dolgovs	TKO	1 (6), 1:41	6 Nov 2010	University Arena, Limerick, Ireland	
11	Win	11–0	Jason Barnett	KO	1 (8), 2:40	26 Jun 2010	Neptune Sports Arena, Cork, Ireland	
10	Win	10–0	Tomas Mrazek	TKO	3 (4), 1:48	15 May 2010	University Arena, Limerick, Ireland	
9	Win	9–0	Edgars Kalnārs	TKO	1 (4), 0:48	15 May 2010	University Arena, Limerick, Ireland	
8	Win	8–0	Zack Page	PTS	8	28 Feb 2009	Lightfoot Centre, Newcastle, England	
7	Win	7–0	Harry Duiven Jr	KO	2 (6), 0:22	17 Jan 2009	Silver Springs Moran Hotel, Cork, Ireland	
6	Win	6–0	Luis Oscar Ricail	TKO	1 (6), 1:24	26 Oct 2008	Gleneagle Hotel, Killarney, Ireland	
5	Win	5–0	Claudemir Dias	KO	1 (8), 0:22	13 Sep 2008	Neptune Sports Arena, Cork, Ireland	
4	Win	4–0	Howard Daley	TKO	1 (4), 1:27	12 Apr 2008	Breaffy House Resort, Castlebar, Ireland	
3	Win	3–0	Tomasz Zeprzalka	PTS	6	22 Mar 2008	National Boxing Stadium, Dublin, Ireland	
2	Win	2–0	Sándor Balogh	TKO	1 (4), 0:41	2 Feb 2008	University Arena, Limerick, Ireland	
1	Win	1–0	Jevgēņijs Stamburskis	TKO	1 (4), 1:35	26 Jan 2008	Neptune Sports Arena, Cork, Ireland	
