= Mairis Briedis vs. Mike Perez =

Boxing match

- Date: 30 September 2017
- Venue: Arena Riga, Riga, Latvia
- Title(s) on the line: WBC cruiserweight title

Tale of the tape
Boxer	Mairis Briedis	Mike Perez
Nickname	The Latvian Punisher	The Rebel
Hometown	Riga, Latvia	Sancti Spíritus, Cuba
Pre-fight record	22–0 (18 KO)	22–2–1 (14 KO)
Age	32 years, 8 months	31 years, 11 months
Height	6 ft 1 in (185 cm)	6 ft 1 in (185 cm)
Weight	198 1/2 lb (90 kg)	197 1/3 lb (90 kg)
Style	Orthodox	Southpaw
Recognition	WBC; Cruiserweight Champion; The Ring; No. 4 Ranked Cruiserweight; TBRB; No. 6 Ranked Cruiserweight	WBC; No. 12 Ranked Cruiserweight

Result
- Briedis defeats Perez via UD (116–110, 114–112, 115–111)

Mairis Briedis vs. Mike Perez was a professional boxing match contested on 30 September 2017, for the WBC cruiserweight championship.

== Background ==
At the WBSS Draft Gala, which took place on 8 July in Monte Carlo, WBC champion Mairis Briedis chose former heavyweight contender Mike Perez (22–2–1, 14 KOs) as his quarter-final opponent. Perez had been out of action for 25 months before moving down from the heavyweight division following a TKO loss to Alexander Povetkin and won his first fight at that weight with a first-round knockout on 10 June 2017. On 22 July, the WBSS announced the fight would take place in Briedis' home country of Latvia at the Rīga Arēna in Riga on 30 September 2017 and would be the third quarter final, coming a week after Yunier Dorticos knocked out Dmitry Kudryashov. At the official weigh-in, Briedis tipped the scales at 198 1/2 lbs, while Mike Perez came in lighter, at 197 1/3 lbs. This was Briedis' first defence of the belt he won against Marco Huck in April.

== The fight ==
Briedis won a scrappy fight, beating Perez by unanimous decision after 12 rounds (116–110, 114–112, 115–111). Perez was deducted a point in round 3 following an accidental headbutt. Briedis was also docked a point during round 10 for excessive holding.

== Aftermath ==
With the win, Briedis moved on to the semifinals to face top-seeded Oleksandr Usyk.

== Undercard ==
Confirmed bouts:

== Broadcasting ==
Country	Broadcaster
Baltic & Nordic countries	Viasat
Belgium	VOO
Bulgaria	Nova
Canada	Super Channel
Germany	SAT.1
Russia	Match! Boets
Singapore	StarHub
Sub-Saharan Africa	TVMS
Turkey	Tivibu Sports
United Kingdom	ITV
United States	Audience
Ukraine	Inter

Preceded by vs. Marco Huck	Mairis Briedis's bouts 30 September 2017	Succeeded by vs. Oleksandr Usyk
Preceded by vs. Viktor Biscak	Mike Perez's bouts 30 September 2017	Succeeded by vs. Pablo Matias Magrini
