= Tyrone Booze =

American boxer (1959–2022)

Personal information
- Born: February 12, 1959 Hartford, Connecticut, U.S.
- Died: September 3, 2022 (aged 63) Florida, U.S.
- Weight: Cruiserweight

Boxing career
- Stance: Orthodox

Boxing record
- Total fights: 37
- Wins: 22
- Win by KO: 8
- Losses: 12
- Draws: 2
- No contests: 1

Tyrone Booze (February 12, 1959 – September 3, 2022) was an American boxer who held the WBO cruiserweight championship from 1992 to 1993.

Booze became a professional boxer in 1982 and had mixed success during his early career. He had early losses in the 1980s to Evander Holyfield, Eddie Mustafa Muhammad, Johnny DuPlooy, Bert Cooper, Dwight Muhammad Qawi, and Henry Tillman. In 1990 he lost to Nate Miller for the North American Boxing Federation cruiserweight title by a unanimous decision.

After winning one fight he then challenged Magne Havnaa in 1991 for the WBO cruiserweight title. He lost a twelve-round split decision. When Havnaa relinquished his title, Booze knocked out Derek Angol on July 25, 1992 at G-Mex Centre, Manchester, England to win the vacant WBO title. He defended the belt once, against Ralf Rocchigiani. On February 13, 1993, Markus Bott defeated Booze by a unanimous decision to take the title.

Booze did not fight for a title again and retired in 1998 after losing to Jesse Ferguson.

On September 19, 2011, Tyrone Booze and Super Bowl XXXVII MVP Dexter Jackson began a new radio show called "All Sports" with Randy Harris on Clearwater, Florida's WTAN AM 1340. The show is also aired on WDCF, WZHR and online on the Talking Sports Network.

Tyrone Booze died in Florida on September 3, 2022, at the age of 63.

== Professional boxing record ==
22 Wins (8 KOs), 12 Losses (2 KOs), 2 Draws, 1 No Contest
Result	Record	Opponent	Type	Round	Date	Location	Notes
Loss	22-12-2; 1 NC	(United States) Jesse Ferguson	UD	10	1998-09-03	Foxwoods Resort, Mashantucket, Connecticut	
Win	22-11-2; 1 NC	(United States) Tony Velasco	TKO	5	1997-11-22	Auditorium, Clearwater, Florida	
Win	21-11-2; 1 NC	(United States) James Mullins	TKO	4	1996-03-23	Bristol, Tennessee	
Win	20-11-2; 1 NC	(United States) Earl Talley	TKO	3	1995-12-09	Jaycee Fairground Arena, Tuscaloosa, Alabama	
Win	19-11-2; 1 NC	(United States) Jack Jackson	TKO	3	1995-08-12	(Georgia (U.S. state)) Albany, Georgia	
Win	18-11-2; 1 NC	(United States) Marc Machain	TKO	5	1994-07-20	Raleigh, North Carolina	
Loss	17-11-2; 1 NC	(Germany) Markus Bott	UD	12	1993-02-13	Sporthalle, Alsterdorf, Hamburg, Germany	Lost WBO cruiserweight title.
Win	17-10-2; 1 NC	(Germany) Ralf Rocchigiani	UD	12	1992-10-02	Deutschlandhalle, Charlottenburg, Berlin, Germany	Retained WBO cruiserweight title.
Win	16-10-2; 1 NC	(United Kingdom) Derek Angol	KO	7	1992-07-25	(United Kingdom) G-Mex Centre, Manchester, England	Won vacant WBO cruiserweight title.
Loss	15-10-2; 1 NC	(Norway) Magne Havnå	SD	12	1991-02-15	Randers Hallen, Randers, Denmark	For WBO cruiserweight title.
Win	15-9-2; 1 NC	(United States) Ruben Cardona	UD	6	1990-07-13	Windjammer Inn, Westerly, Rhode Island	
Loss	14-9-2; 1 NC	(United States) Nate Miller	UD	12	1990-03-26	Harrah's Marina Hotel Casino, Atlantic City, New Jersey	For NABF cruiserweight title.
Loss	14-8-2; 1 NC	(United States) Dwight Muhammad Qawi	PTS	10	1989-02-15	Pennsylvania Hall, Philadelphia, Pennsylvania	
Win	14-7-2; 1 NC	(United States) Anthony Witherspoon	UD	10	1988-10-20	Woodhaven Sports Center, Philadelphia, Pennsylvania	
Win	13-7-2; 1 NC	(United States) Dawud Shaw	TKO	2	1988-09-02	Marriott Hotel, Wallingford, Connecticut	
Win	12-7-2; 1 NC	(United States) Kevin Denson	PTS	8	1988-05-30	Marriott Hotel, Trumbull, Connecticut	
NC	11-7-2; 1 NC	(United States) James Holly	NC	1	1988-01-23	South Parkersburg High School, Parkersburg, West Virginia	
Loss	11-7-2	(South Africa) Johnny du Plooy	KO	2	1987-07-27	Standard Bank Arena, Johannesburg, South Africa	
Loss	11-6-2	(United States) Henry Tillman	UD	10	1986-10-17	Sahara Hotel, Las Vegas, Nevada	
Loss	11-5-2	(United States) Bert Cooper	SD	12	1986-08-26	Stateline, Nevada	For NABF cruiserweight title.
Win	11-4-2	(United States) Pablo Pizzarro	UD	10	1985-10-18	Civic Center Coliseum, Hartford, Connecticut	
Loss	10-4-2	(United States) Evander Holyfield	UD	8	1985-07-20	Scope Arena, Norfolk, Virginia	
Loss	10-3-2	(United States) Eddie Mustafa Muhammad	UD	10	1985-02-08	(New York (state)) Felt Forum, New York, New York	
Draw	10-2-2	(United States) Tim Broady	PTS	10	1984-11-27	Sands Casino Hotel, Atlantic City, New Jersey	
Win	10-2-1	(United States) Demetrius Edwards	PTS	10	1984-09-11	West Hartford, Connecticut	
Win	9-2-1	(United States) Marcus Jackson	UD	12	1984-06-19	Agora Ballroom, West Hartford, Connecticut	Won New England light-heavyweight title.
Draw	8-2-1	(United States) Jerry Halstead	PTS	8	1984-01-13	Civic Center, Hartford, Connecticut	
Win	8-2	(United States) John Tyrell	PTS	6	1983-08-09	Agora Ballroom, Hartford, Connecticut	
Win	7-2	(United States) Jose Verdejo	PTS	6	1983-05-31	West Hartford, Connecticut	
Loss	6-2	(United States) Kelvin Kelly	SD	4	1983-04-23	Civic Center Coliseum, Hartford, Connecticut	
Win	6-1	(United States) Earl McNeill	PTS	6	1983-01-07	Civic Center Coliseum, Hartford, Connecticut	
Win	5-1	(United States) Victor King	UD	4	1982-10-08	Civic Center Assembly Hall, Hartford, Connecticut	
Win	4-1	(United States) Juan Quintana	TKO	3	1982-09-10	Civic Center Coliseum, Hartford, Connecticut	
Win	3-1	(United States) Matt Lawrence	PTS	4	1982-08-13	Veterans Memorial Coliseum, New Haven, Connecticut	
Loss	2-1	(United States) Muhammad Hakeem	TKO	3	1982-07-09	Wonderland of Ice, Bridgeport, Connecticut	
Win	2-0	(United States) Robert Folley	PTS	6	1982-06-05	Civic Center Coliseum, Hartford, Connecticut	
Win	1-0	(United States) Jimmy Allen	PTS	4	1982-04-23	New Haven, Connecticut	Professional debut.

Achievements
Vacant Title last held by Magne Havnaa	WBO cruiserweight champion July 25, 1992 – February 13, 1993	Succeeded by Markus Bott
