= Dexter Jackson (safety) =

American football player (born 1977)

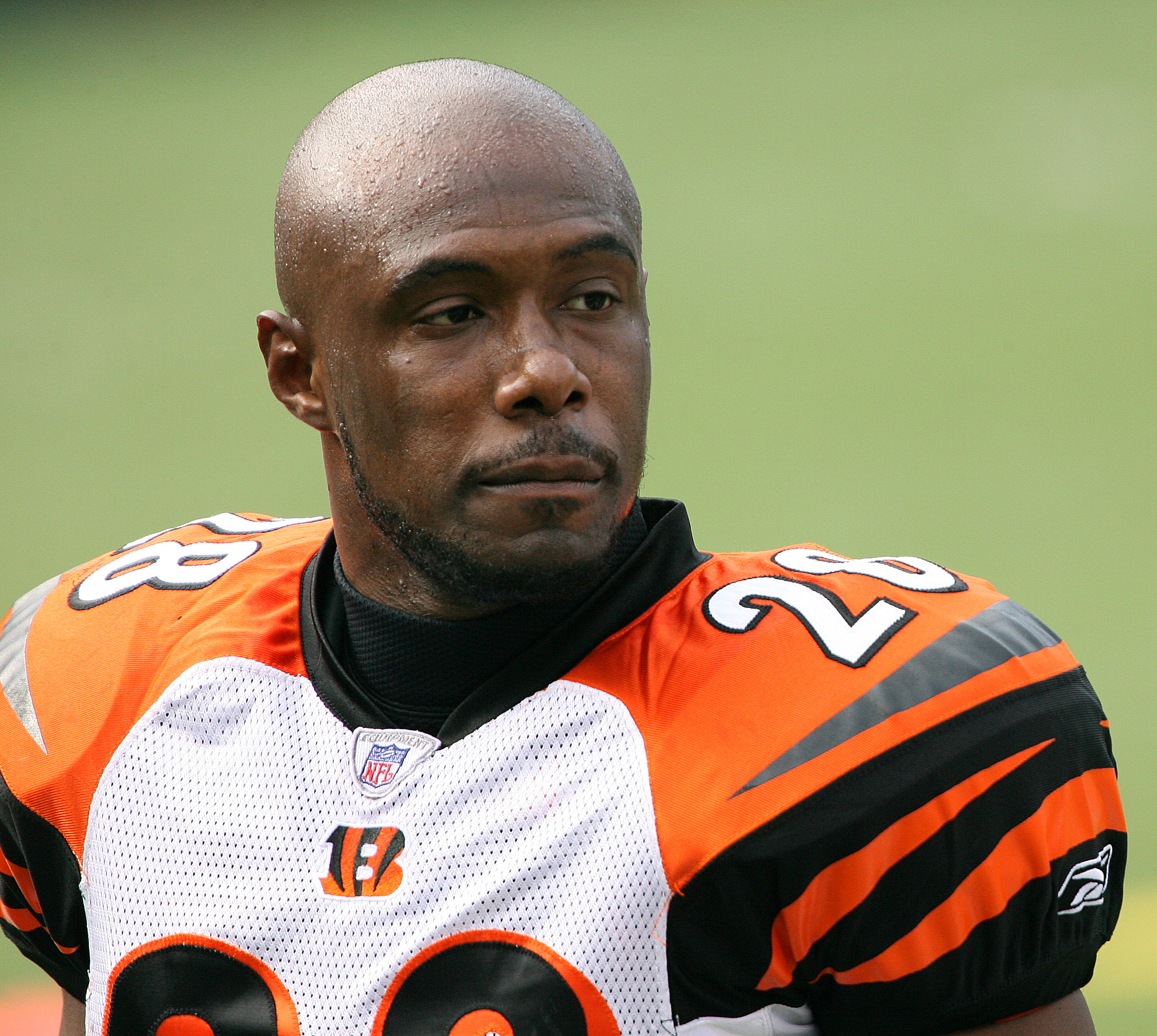
- Jackson with the Cincinnati Bengals in 2006

No. 34, 28
- Position: Safety

Personal information
- Born: July 28, 1977 (age 49); Quincy, Florida, U.S.
- Listed height: 6 ft 0 in (1.83 m)
- Listed weight: 210 lb (95 kg)

Career information
- High school: Shanks (Quincy)
- College: Florida State (1995–1998)
- NFL draft: 1999: 4th round, 113th overall pick

Career history
- Tampa Bay Buccaneers (1999–2002); Arizona Cardinals (2003–2004); Tampa Bay Buccaneers (2004–2005); Cincinnati Bengals (2006–2008); Florida Tuskers (2009)

Awards and highlights
- Super Bowl champion (XXXVII); Super Bowl MVP (XXXVII); 2× Second-team All-ACC (1997, 1998)

Career NFL statistics
- Total tackles: 457
- Sacks: 5.0
- Forced fumbles: 5
- Fumble recoveries: 5
- Interceptions: 17
- Stats at Pro Football Reference

Dexter Lamar Jackson (born July 28, 1977) is an American former professional football player who was a safety in the National Football League (NFL). He was selected by the Tampa Bay Buccaneers in the fourth round of the 1999 NFL draft. He played college football at Florida State.

Jackson won Super Bowl XXXVII with the Buccaneers and was named the game's MVP. Jackson also played for the Arizona Cardinals and Cincinnati Bengals.

== College career ==
Jackson attended Florida State University and was a Human Science Major and a letterman in football. In football, he was named as an All-Atlantic Coast Conference as a junior, and he finished his college football career with 194 tackles, 7 interceptions, 16 passes defensed, one forced fumble, one fumble recovery, and blocked four field goals.

== Professional career ==
Pre-draft measurables
| Height | Weight | Arm length | Hand span | 40-yard dash | 10-yard split | 20-yard split | 20-yard shuttle | Three-cone drill | Vertical jump | Broad jump | Bench press |
|---|---|---|---|---|---|---|---|---|---|---|---|
| 5 ft 11 3/4 in (1.82 m) | 196 lb (89 kg) | 31 in (0.79 m) | 8 7/8 in (0.23 m) | 4.64 s | 1.60 s | 2.70 s | 4.06 s | 6.96 s | 36.0 in (0.91 m) | 9 ft 9 in (2.97 m) | 10 reps |
All values from NFL Combine

=== Tampa Bay Buccaneers (first stint) ===
Jackson was selected by the Tampa Bay Buccaneers in the fourth round (113th overall) of the 1999 NFL draft. He made his NFL debut versus the Denver Broncos.

Jackson was the MVP of Super Bowl XXXVII, a 48–21 win over the Oakland Raiders, recording two interceptions. He was the first safety to win the award since Jake Scott in 1973, the third defensive back overall (joining Scott and Larry Brown).

=== Arizona Cardinals ===
The Super Bowl win came just before Jackson declared for free agency. The Pittsburgh Steelers had a verbal agreement to sign Jackson; however, he backed out at the last minute and signed with the Arizona Cardinals instead. The Steelers then went to "Plan B" and drafted Troy Polamalu.

=== Tampa Bay Buccaneers (second stint) ===
Jackson rejoined the Buccaneers in 2004, and played with them until the end of the 2005 season.

=== Cincinnati Bengals ===
Before the 2006 season, Jackson signed with the Cincinnati Bengals as a free agent. He played three seasons with the team before being released on March 6, 2009.

=== Florida Tuskers ===
Jackson finished his professional career with the Florida Tuskers of the United Football League. Jackson was among several former Buccaneers on the Tuskers' inaugural roster and played for the team for the 2009 season before retiring.

== Coaching career ==
Jackson has coached in the greater Atlanta area with CoachUp, a private coaching service.

== Broadcasting career ==
On September 19, 2011, Dexter Jackson and former World Boxing Organization cruiserweight world champion Tyrone Booze began a new radio show called "All Sports" with Randy Harris on Clearwater, Florida's WTAN AM 1340. The show has also aired on WDCF, WZHR and online on the Talking Sports Network.

== Personal life ==
Jackson is married to Tina Jackson (of Miami, FL) and has four daughters: Jazmine, Daisia, Meah, and Taylor. Jackson served as Youth & Recreation Manager for the Tampa Housing Authority, a non-profit organization in Tampa. He no longer has a title there. Jackson's nephew, Darrell, was selected in the fourth round of the 2026 NFL draft by the New York Jets.

== NFL career statistics ==
Legend
| | Super Bowl MVP |
| | Won the Super Bowl |
| **Bold** | Career high |

| Year | Team | GP | Tackles | | | | Fumbles | | | Interceptions | | | | |
| Year | Team | GP | Cmb | Solo | Ast | Sck | FF | FR | Yds | Int | Yds | Lng | TD | PD |
|---|---|---|---|---|---|---|---|---|---|---|---|---|---|---|
| 1999 | TB | 12 | 2 | 2 | 0 | 0.0 | 0 | 0 | 0 | 0 | 0 | 0 | 0 | 0 |
| 2000 | TB | 13 | 20 | 18 | 2 | 0.0 | 0 | 1 | 0 | 0 | 0 | 0 | 0 | 0 |
| 2001 | TB | 15 | 66 | 55 | 11 | **2.5** | **2** | 0 | 0 | 4 | 42 | 29 | 0 | 8 |
| 2002 | TB | 16 | 71 | 56 | 15 | 0.0 | 0 | 1 | 0 | 3 | 101 | **58** | 0 | 6 |
| 2003 | ARI | 16 | **88** | **75** | 13 | 0.0 | 1 | 0 | 0 | **6** | **122** | 30 | 0 | **14** |
| 2004 | TB | 6 | 15 | 13 | 2 | 0.0 | 1 | 0 | 0 | 0 | 0 | 0 | 0 | 0 |
| 2005 | TB | 11 | 45 | 32 | 13 | 1.0 | 0 | 0 | 0 | 1 | 21 | 21 | 0 | 5 |
| 2006 | CIN | 12 | 55 | 39 | 16 | 1.0 | 0 | 1 | 0 | 1 | 46 | 46 | 0 | 4 |
| 2007 | CIN | 14 | 72 | 44 | **28** | 0.5 | 0 | **2** | **19** | 2 | 7 | 7 | 0 | 3 |
| 2008 | CIN | 3 | 21 | 14 | 7 | 0.0 | 0 | 0 | 0 | 0 | 0 | 0 | 0 | 1 |
| Career | | 118 | 455 | 348 | 107 | 5.0 | 5 | 5 | 19 | 17 | 339 | 58 | 0 | 41 |
