= Rocchigiani =

Rocchigiani is a surname. Notable people with the surname include:

- Graciano Rocchigiani (1963–2018), German boxer
- Ralf Rocchigiani (born 1963), German boxer
