= WFHT =

WFHT may refer to:

- WKSG (FM), a radio station (98.3 FM) licensed to serve Garrison, Kentucky, United States, which held the call sign WFHT in 2021 and in 2022
- WAVP, a radio station (1390 AM) licensed to serve Avon Park, Florida, United States, which held the call sign WFHT during 2021
