= Dariusz Michalczewski =

Polish-German boxer

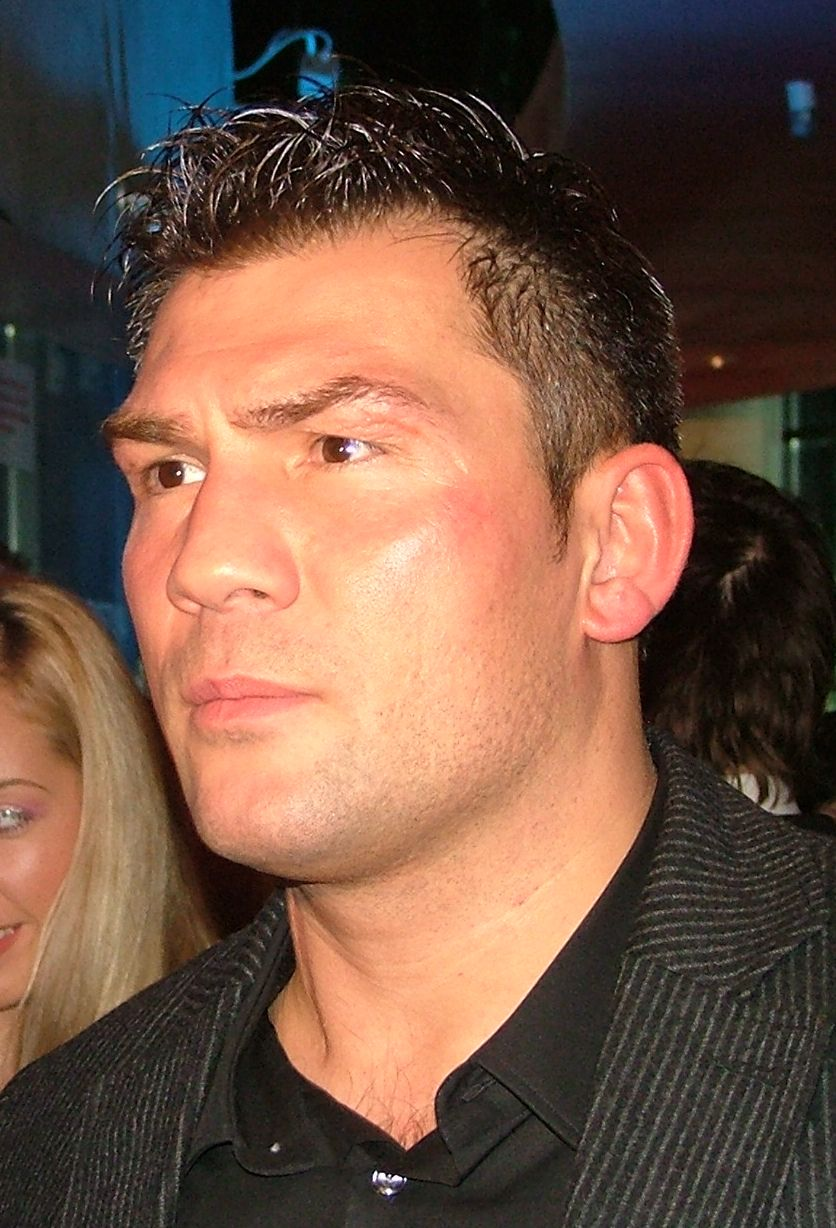
- Michalczewski in 2007

Personal information
- Nickname: Tiger
- Nationality: Polish; German
- Born: 5 May 1968 (age 58) Gdańsk, Poland
- Height: 1.84 m (6 ft 0 in)
- Weight: Light-heavyweight; Cruiserweight

Boxing career
- Reach: 178 cm (70 in)
- Stance: Orthodox

Boxing record
- Total fights: 50
- Wins: 48
- Win by KO: 38
- Losses: 2
Medal record
Men's amateur boxing
Representing Germany
European Championships
Gold medal – first place	1991 Gothenburg	Light-heavyweight
Representing Poland
European Junior Championships
Silver medal – second place	1986 Copenhagen	Middleweight

Dariusz Tomasz Michalczewski (born 5 May 1968) is a Polish-German professional boxer who competed from 1991 to 2005. He held multiple world championships in two weight classes, including the WBA, IBF, WBO and lineal light heavyweight titles between 1994 and 2003, and the WBO junior-heavyweight title from 1994 to 1995.

== Early life and amateur career ==
He was born in 1968 in Gdańsk to father Bogusław Michalczewski, a radio technician working for the Polish State Railways and mother Maria, an accountant. In his youth, before turning to boxing, he initially practiced wrestling and football.

Michalczewski came up through Poland's state-run sports program as a boy and had a successful amateur career. He achieved an amateur record of 139–11–2 (89 KO). Highlights of his amateur career include:

- 1986 – European Junior Semi-Finalist in middleweight division, defeating Fabrice Tiozzo but losing to Ray Close
- 1990 – German National Champion in light heavyweight division
- 1991 – European Champion in light heavyweight division

== Defection to Germany ==
On 24 April 1988, while competing beyond the Iron Curtain in West Germany for the Polish national team, Michalczewski defected from the amateur team to stay in West Germany. Becoming a citizen of the now united Germany in 1991 and turning professional the same year, he was soon signed by Universum Box-Promotion, one of the leading boxing promoters in Europe. His aggressive style earned him the nickname "Tiger".

== Professional career ==
Michalczewski turned professional in September 1991. He won the German International light-heavyweight title early on 13 February 1993, a title for foreign-born fighters based in Germany. He then won the IBF Intercontinental title on 22 May 1993.

=== Two-weight world champion ===
On 10 September 1994, Michalczewski, at 23-0 (18 KOs), captured the WBO light-heavyweight title with a 12-round decision over defending champion Leeonzer Barber at Sporthalle, Alsterdorf, Hamburg, Germany. Between then and March 2003, Michalczewski made 23 successful defenses of his WBO title against 20 different boxers, and picked up three other belts along the way. Three months after beating Barber, he won the WBO cruiserweight title with a tenth-round knockout of Nestor Giovannini. However, he soon gave up that title to continue campaigning as a light-heavyweight.

In 1996, Universum Box-Promotion's conditioning coach Fritz Sdunek became head coach and replaced Chuck Talhami as Michalczewski's trainer, which resulted in a marked improvement in Michalczewski's performances.

=== Hill vs Michalczewski unification ===
On 13 June 1997, he defeated Virgil Hill over 12 rounds to add Hill's WBA, IBF and Lineal light-heavyweight titles to his own. However, Michalczewski soon lost both alphabet titles; Scandalously, the WBA immediately stripped him for displaying its belt along with that of the WBO. Michalczewski was then forced to relinquish the IBF title when he was unable to defend the title in a court-ordered defense against mandatory challenger William Guthrie within a little over a month after the bout with Hill.

After beating Hill, Michalczewski knocked out 14 consecutive opponents, all in defense of his Lineal/WBO titles. In 1998, he defeated Drake Thadzi, in 1999, he defeated Montel Griffin, and in 2000, he defeated Graciano Rocchigiani.

=== Going for Marciano's record ===
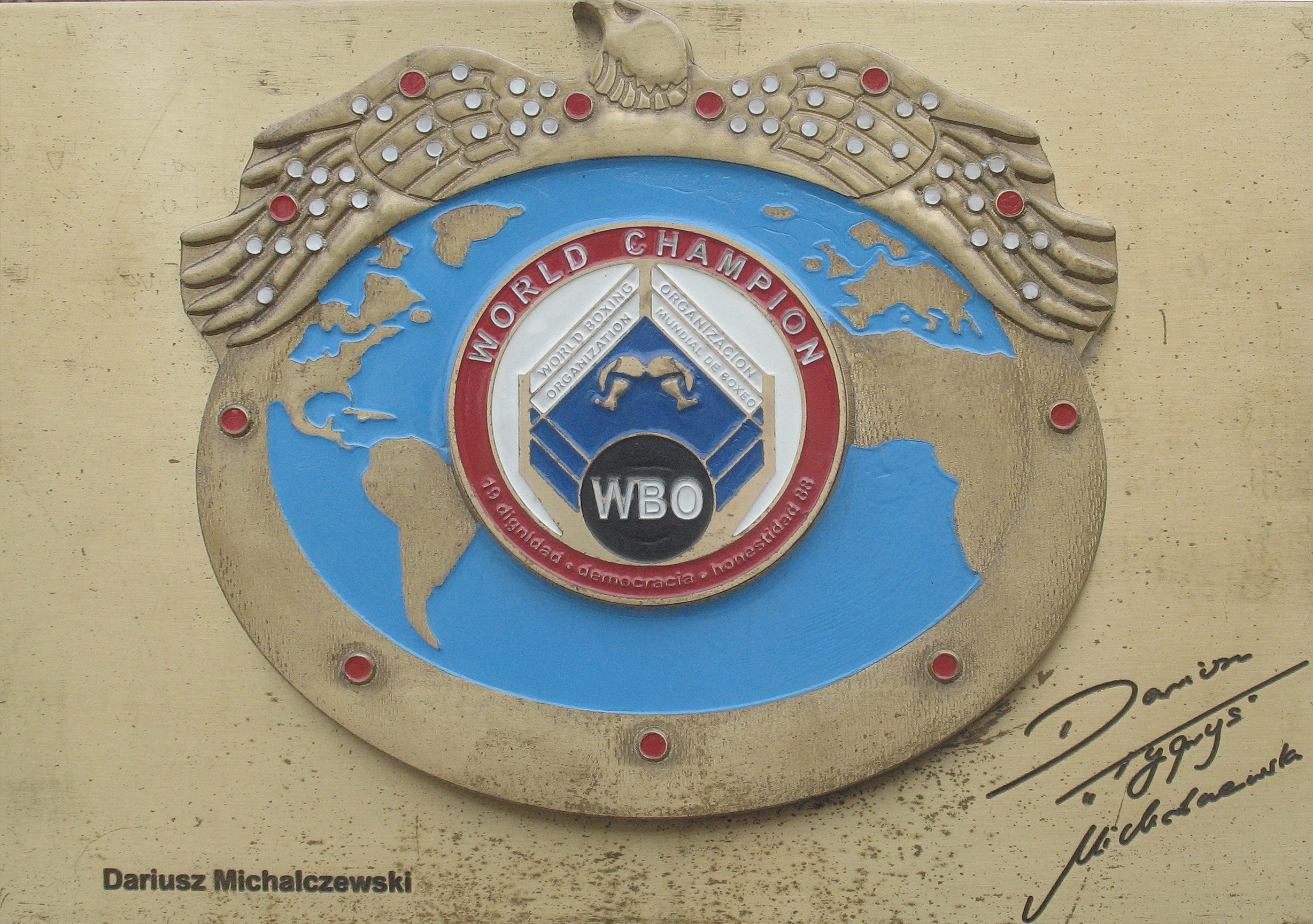
Autographed replica of Michalczewski's WBO title in Dziwnów

Michalczewski had a perfect record of 48-0 when he faced Julio César González of Mexico in defense of his title on 18 October 2003. Coming into the fight, he was within one victory of tying Rocky Marciano's record of 49 wins with no losses. A win also would have put him just one victory short of Joe Louis' all-time record for successful defenses at any weight class. However, as when Larry Holmes went for the same record against Michael Spinks, the now 35-year-old Michalczewski was unable to pull it off. He lost a split decision to the 27-year-old Gonzalez at the Color Line Arena in Hamburg, and his career record dropped to 48–1.

Despite the loss, he still holds the record for the most consecutive successful world title defenses at light-heavyweight.

=== Final fight ===
In October 2004, it was announced that Michalczewski would come out of retirement to box France's Fabrice Tiozzo for the WBA light heavyweight title on 26 February 2005 in Hamburg. Michalczewski was stopped in six round, then he announced his retirement in May 2005.

Michalczewski was to come out of retirement to fight German boxing icon but suspected cheat Sven Ottke in Germany in May 2008, but the bout never materialized.

== In popular culture ==
- Tiger Energy Drink is named after the famous boxer. His picture and text "Recommended by Dariusz 'Tiger' Michalczewski" appears on the cans and bottles.
- Dariusz Michalczewski struck a friendship with performer Mark Wahlberg, known at the time by his stage name Marky Mark of the formation Marky Mark and the Funky Bunch. In 1995, Marky Mark released a track called "No Mercy" about his friend Dariusz Michalczewski, including excerpts in Polish from Dariusz, who also appears in the video clip shot by Frank Papenbroock. "No Mercy" appears in the album The Remix Album by Prince Ital Joe and Marky Mark, although this particular track is a solo effort by Marky Mark.
- In 2006, a documentary was made by Pawel Kocambasi alias P.M.Starost. The 60-minute documentary entitled "Tiger" took part in Filmfest München and won the award for the Best Documentary at the Biberacher Filmfestspiele.

== Social involvement ==
In 2003 Dariusz Michalczewski established foundation "Równe Szanse" (equal chances) which was aimed at supporting initiatives for youth from dysfunctional families. Since 2014 he supports the social campaign for civil union and the right for adoption by homosexual couples.

== Professional boxing record ==
50 fights	48 wins	2 losses
By knockout	38	1
By decision	7	1
By disqualification	3	0

No.	Result	Record	Opponent	Type	Round, time	Date	Location	Notes
50	Loss	48–2	Fabrice Tiozzo	TKO	6 (12), 2:05	26 Feb 2005	Color Line Arena, Hamburg, Germany	For WBA light-heavyweight title
49	Loss	48–1	Julio César González	SD	12	18 Oct 2003	Color Line Arena, Hamburg, Germany	Lost WBO light-heavyweight title
48	Win	48–0	Derrick Harmon	KO	9 (12)	29 Mar 2003	Color Line Arena, Hamburg, Germany	Retained WBO light-heavyweight title
47	Win	47–0	Richard Hall	TKO	10 (12)	14 Sep 2002	Volkswagen Halle, Braunschweig, Germany	Retained WBO light-heavyweight title
46	Win	46–0	Joey DeGrandis	KO	2 (12)	20 Apr 2002	Hala Olivia, Gdańsk, Poland	Retained WBO light-heavyweight title
45	Win	45–0	Richard Hall	TKO	11 (12), 1:50	15 Dec 2001	Estrel Hotel, Berlin, Germany	Retained WBO light-heavyweight title
44	Win	44–0	Alejandro Lakatos	KO	9 (12), 1:35	5 May 2001	Volkswagen Halle, Braunschweig, Germany	Retained WBO light-heavyweight title
43	Win	43–0	Ka-Dy King	TKO	7 (12), 0:28	16 Dec 2000	Grugahalle, Essen, Germany	Retained WBO light-heavyweight title
42	Win	42–0	Graciano Rocchigiani	TKO	10 (12), 3:00	15 Apr 2000	Preussag Arena, Hanover, Germany	Retained WBO light-heavyweight title
41	Win	41–0	Montell Griffin	TKO	4 (12), 2:59	28 Aug 1999	Stadthalle, Bremen, Germany	Retained WBO light-heavyweight title
40	Win	40–0	Muslim Biarslanov	TKO	7 (12), 1:41	3 Apr 1999	Stadthalle, Bremen, Germany	Retained WBO light heavyweight title
39	Win	39–0	Drake Thadzi	TKO	9 (12), 1:45	12 Dec 1998	Ballsporthalle, Frankfurt, Germany	Retained WBO light-heavyweight title
38	Win	38–0	Mark Prince	KO	8 (12)	19 Sep 1998	Arena Oberhausen, Oberhausen, Germany	Retained WBO light-heavyweight title
37	Win	37–0	Andrea Magi	TKO	4 (12)	20 Mar 1998	Ballsporthalle, Frankfurt, Germany	Retained WBO light-heavyweight title
36	Win	36–0	Darren Zenner	RTD	6 (12), 3:00	13 Dec 1997	Alsterdorfer Sporthalle, Hamburg, Germany	Retained WBO light-heavyweight title
35	Win	35–0	Nicky Piper	TKO	7 (12), 3:00	4 Oct 1997	Stadionsporthalle, Hanover, Germany	Retained WBO light-heavyweight title
34	Win	34–0	Virgil Hill	UD	12	13 Jun 1997	Arena Oberhausen, Oberhausen, Germany	Retained WBO light-heavyweight title; Won WBA and IBF light-heavyweight titles
33	Win	33–0	Christophe Girard	TKO	8 (12)	13 Dec 1996	Stadionsporthalle, Hanover, Germany	Retained WBO light-heavyweight title
32	Win	32–0	Graciano Rocchigiani	DQ	7 (12), 3:00	10 Aug 1996	Wilhelm-Koch-Stadion, Hamburg, Germany	Retained WBO light-heavyweight title; Rocchigiani disqualified for punching after a clinch
31	Win	31–0	Christophe Girard	UD	12	8 Jun 1996	Sporthalle, Cologne, Germany	Retained WBO light-heavyweight title
30	Win	30–0	Asluddin Umarov	TKO	5 (12), 2:30	6 Apr 1996	Stadionsporthalle, Hanover, Germany	Retained WBO light-heavyweight title
29	Win	29–0	Philippe Michel	UD	12	7 Oct 1995	Festhalle, Frankfurt, Germany	Retained WBO light-heavyweight title
28	Win	28–0	Everardo Armenta Jr.	KO	5 (12), 2:59	19 Aug 1995	Eisstadion an der Brehmstraße, Düsseldorf, Germany	Retained WBO light-heavyweight title
27	Win	27–0	Paul Carlo	KO	4 (12), 2:46	20 May 1995	Alsterdorfer Sporthalle, Hamburg, Germany	Retained WBO light-heavyweight title
26	Win	26–0	Roberto Dominguez	KO	2 (12), 1:05	11 Mar 1995	Sporthalle, Cologne, Germany	Retained WBO light-heavyweight title
25	Win	25–0	Nestor Hipolito Giovannini	KO	10 (12), 1:25	17 Dec 1994	Alsterdorfer Sporthalle, Hamburg, Germany	Won WBO junior-heavyweight title
24	Win	24–0	Leeonzer Barber	UD	12	10 Sep 1994	Alsterdorfer Sporthalle, Hamburg, Germany	Won WBO light-heavyweight title
23	Win	23–0	Melvin Wynn	KO	2, 3:05	28 May 1994	Tivoli Eissporthalle, Aachen, Germany	
22	Win	22–0	David Davis	KO	7 (10)	23 Apr 1994	Sporthalle Bildungszentrum, Halle, Germany	
21	Win	21–0	David Vedder	DQ	1	19 Feb 1994	Sporthalle Wandsbek, Hamburg, Germany	
20	Win	20–0	Sergio Daniel Merani	TD	9 (12)	20 Nov 1993	Alsterdorfer Sporthalle, Hamburg, Germany	Retained IBF Inter-Continental light-heavyweight title
19	Win	19–0	Mwehu Beya	PTS	12	11 Sep 1993	Tivoli Eissporthalle, Aachen, Germany	Retained IBF Inter-Continental light-heavyweight title
18	Win	18–0	Juan Alberto Barrero	KO	5 (10)	26 Jun 1993	Alsterdorfer Sporthalle, Hamburg, Germany	
17	Win	17–0	Noel Magee	TKO	8 (12)	22 May 1993	Tivoli Eissporthalle, Aachen, Germany	Won vacant IBF Inter-Continental light-heavyweight title
16	Win	16–0	Pat Alley	KO	4	3 Apr 1993	Sporthalle Wandsbek, Hamburg, Germany	
15	Win	15–0	Ali Saidi	KO	10 (10)	13 Feb 1993	Alsterdorfer Sporthalle, Hamburg, Germany	Won German International light-heavyweight title
14	Win	14–0	Willie McDonald	KO	2 (8)	12 Jan 1993	Saaltheater Geulen, Aachen, Germany	
13	Win	13–0	Mike Peak	PTS	8	8 Dec 1992	Legiencenter, Hamburg, Germany	
12	Win	12–0	Keith Williams	TKO	2	17 Nov 1992	Holstentorhalle, Lübeck, Germany	
11	Win	11–0	Cecil Simms	KO	2	7 Nov 1992	Sporthalle, Cologne, Germany	
10	Win	10–0	Steve McCarthy	DQ	3 (10), 2:59	29 Sep 1992	Legiencenter, Hamburg, Germany	McCarthy disqualified for an intentional headbutt
9	Win	9–0	Sylvester White	TKO	5	28 Aug 1992	Tivoli Eissporthalle, Aachen, Germany	
8	Win	8–0	Richard Bustin	KO	4 (8)	27 Jun 1992	Hotel, Quinta do Lago, Portugal	
7	Win	7–0	Terrence Wright	TKO	2	22 May 1992	Dinslaken, Germany	
6	Win	6–0	Robert Johnson	TKO	2 (8), 2:41	4 Apr 1992	Düsseldorf, Germany	
5	Win	5–0	Sean Mannion	TKO	3	21 Feb 1992	Legiencenter, Hamburg, Germany	
4	Win	4–0	Yves Monsieur	TKO	4 (8)	28 Jan 1992	Legiencenter, Hamburg, Germany	
3	Win	3–0	Zoltan Habda	TKO	2 (6)	10 Jan 1992	Saaltheater Geulen, Aachen, Germany	
2	Win	2–0	Peter Cenki	TKO	2	15 Oct 1991	Legiencenter, Hamburg, Germany	
1	Win	1–0	Frederic Porter	TKO	2	16 Sep 1991	Legiencenter, Hamburg, Germany	

== Titles in boxing ==
=== Major world titles ===
- WBA light heavyweight champion (175 lbs)
- IBF light heavyweight champion (175 lbs)
- WBO light heavyweight champion (175 lbs)
- WBO cruiserweight champion (200 lbs)

=== Regional/International titles ===
- IBF Inter-Continental light heavyweight champion (175 lbs)
- German International light heavyweight champion (175 lbs)

== Television viewership ==
=== Germany ===
Date	Fight	Viewership (avg.)	Source(s)
14 September 2002	Dariusz Michalczewski vs. Richard Hall II	4,140,000	
29 March 2003	Dariusz Michalczewski vs. Derrick Harmon	6,870,000	
19 October 2003	Dariusz Michalczewski vs. Julio César González	7,620,000	
26 February 2005	Dariusz Michalczewski vs. Fabrice Tiozzo	7,870,000	
	Total viewership	26,500,000	

=== Poland ===
Date	Fight	Viewership (avg.)	Source(s)
19 October 2003	Dariusz Michalczewski vs. Julio César González	5,794,000	
	Total viewership	5,794,000	

== See also ==
- List of light heavyweight boxing champions
- List of WBA world champions
- List of IBF world champions
- List of WBO world champions

Sporting positions
Regional boxing titles
Preceded by Ali Saidi	German International light-heavyweight champion 13 February 1993 – 1994; Vacated	Vacant Title next held by Silvio Meinel
Vacant Title last held by Frank Tate	IBF Inter-Continental light-heavyweight champion 22 May 1993 – September 1994; Vacated	Vacant Title next held by Montell Griffin
World boxing titles
Preceded by Leeonzer Barber	WBO light-heavyweight champion 10 September 1994 – 18 October 2003	Succeeded by Julio César González
Preceded by Nestor Hipolito Giovannini	WBO junior-heavyweight champion 17 December 1994 – March 1995; Vacated	Vacant Title next held by Ralf Rocchigiani
Preceded by Virgil Hill	WBA light-heavyweight champion 13 June 1997 – 1 July 1997; Stripped	Vacant Title next held by Lou Del Valle
Preceded by Virgil Hill	IBF light-heavyweight champion 13 June 1997 – 16 June 1997; Stripped	Vacant Title next held by William Guthrie
