= WZHR =

Radio station in Zephyrhills, Florida

Simulcasts WHNR, Cypress Gardens
- Zephyrhills, Florida; United States
- Broadcast area: Eastern Pasco County, Florida
- Frequency: 1400 kHz
- Branding: Boss Hogg Radio

Programming
- Format: Variety (oldies, classic country and rockabilly)
- Affiliations: Fox News Radio; Premiere Networks

Ownership
- Owner: Ferris Waller; (Walco Enterprises, Inc.)
- Sister stations: WHNR; WKFL; WWAB; WAVP

History
- First air date: May 9, 1962
- Former call signs: WZRH (1962–1963); WPAS (1963–1994)

Technical information
- Licensing authority: FCC
- Facility ID: 74550
- Class: C
- Power: 1,000 watts unlimited
- Transmitter coordinates: 28°16′55″N 82°12′29.3″W
- Translator: 104.3 W282CC (Zephyrhills)

Links
- Public license information: Public file; LMS
- Webcast: streamdb9web.securenetsystems.net/cirrusencore/WHNR
- Website: www.bosshoggradio.net

WZHR (1400 AM) is a commercial radio station licensed to Zephyrhills, Florida. It is owned by Ferris Waller, through licensee Walco Enterprises, Inc., with studios in Plant City. WZHR simulcasts a variety radio format, with oldies, classic country and rockabilly. It is part of the "Boss Hogg" network, along with WHNR (1360 AM) in Cypress Gardens, WWAB (1330 AM) in Lakeland, WKFL (1170 AM) in Bushnell, WAVP (1390 AM) in Avon Park and FM translator stations W298BU 107.5 FM Avon Park and W282CC 104.3 FM Zephyrhills.

WZHR is a Class C AM station. It is powered at 1,000 watts using a non-directional antenna.

== History ==
=== WZRH and WPAS ===
WZRH began broadcasting May 9, 1962, nearly 18 months after receiving its construction permit on December 21, 1960. The 250-watt station was owned by the Zephyr Broadcasting Company and affiliated with station WORT of New Smyrna Beach until being sold the next year to Paul Lasobik, a building contractor from Toledo, Ohio. The call letters were changed to WPAS on October 2, 1963, coinciding with the sale.

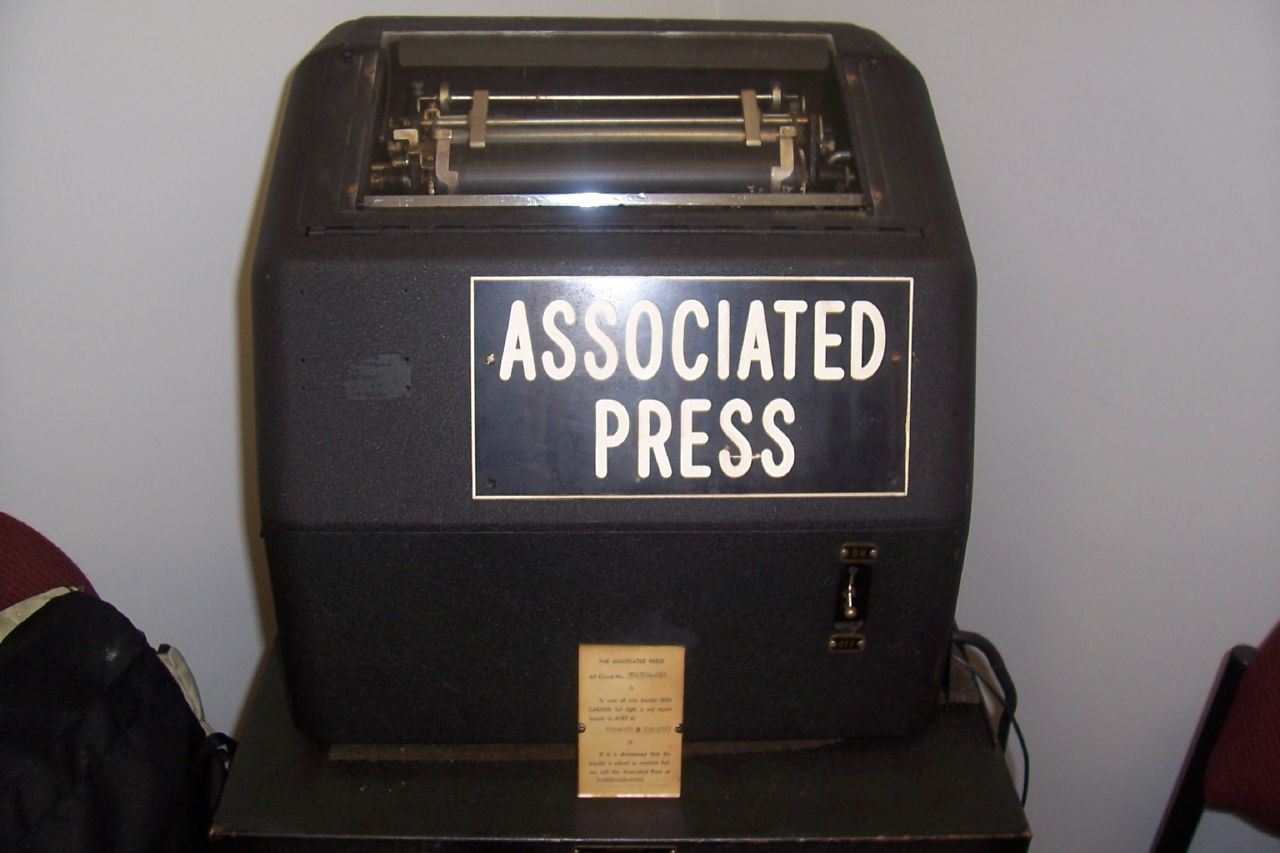
An Associated Press teletype machine of the type that station owners claimed burned down WPAS in 1970

The station was sold in early 1968 to the Art Advertising Company, owned by Robert, Joseph and Adam Artabasy; under Art, the station was approved to increase its power from 250 to 1,000 watts later that year. Two years after taking ownership, disaster struck. In the early morning hours of January 22, 1970, a fire tore through the station, destroying the newly installed transmitter, tape cartridges and office furniture; company paperwork was saved from the blaze. The fire started a spat with the local fire department, which billed the company for $246 in expenses incurred in fighting the blaze. Art would later file a suit against the Associated Press (AP) alleging that the fire was started by a defect in the station's AP teletype machine; the station lost and was ordered to pay $3,500 to the news agency after breaching its contract.

A second event at the station that same year would spark additional legal disputes. In May 1970, three tape cartridge machines were stolen from WPAS. Artabasy notified the Federal Communications Commission (FCC) that similar equipment had just been installed at WDCF, 7 mi (11 km) away; the equipment was located three years later at WDCF, resulting in the arrest of its owner, Ray Webb, who published the Pasco East newspaper and called the arrest political retribution for editorials made in the newspaper. A former WDCF disc jockey, Tony Dexter, confessed to burglarizing WPAS. Charges against Webb were ultimately dismissed in 1975.

While the station grappled with the teletype fire lawsuit and the stolen equipment, Art Advertising was in financial trouble. In February 1972, former owner Lasobik won a judgment against Art for nonpayment, leading to the scheduling of a foreclosure sale for the station's license and assets. The sale was called off after Lasobik and Art reached a $29,000 settlement agreement. The FCC approved a sale of the station to Charles F. Wister in 1974; the sale was originally reported as not consummated before going through that August.

WPAS was sold to Mayo Communications of Plattsburgh, New York, in 1979. The new ownership, however, quickly turned sour. Wister filed a foreclosure lawsuit just six months after Mayo took over, alleging that the station was being so thoroughly mismanaged that he felt he would not get the money he was owed; it was behind on payroll taxes and payments to Wister. Mayo filed for bankruptcy protection, and David Ayres, former operations manager, was appointed as the station's receiver; Wister then went to work, at no cost, as a salesman to keep WPAS running. Wister emerged the owner again and held onto the station for another decade, moving it from its original location on U.S. Highway 301 to a shopping center in 1987. Wister was able to sell the station, this time for good, when Big Z Broadcasting, owned by the Zeplowitz family, purchased WPAS for $335,000 in 1989.

=== WZHR ===
In 1994, Zephyr Broadcasting, Inc., owner of WDCF, acquired WPAS for $200,000. The call letters were changed to WZHR on October 1, 1994, to symbolize the end of the bitter rivalry between the two outlets.

Wagenvoord Advertising Company, owner of WTAN (1340 AM) in Clearwater, acquired WDCF and WZHR in separate transactions in early 2002; the three stations began sharing programming, giving the three outlets a larger combined coverage area. The stations programmed a brokered talk format. Dave Wagenvoord, owner of the group, died in 2014.

Effective May 12, 2023, Wagenvoord Advertising Group sold WZHR and translator W282CC to Ferris Waller's Walco Enterprises, Inc. for $150,000. WZHR and W282CC joined Waller's "Boss Hogg" Radio Network.
