= Alex Blanchard =

Dutch boxer

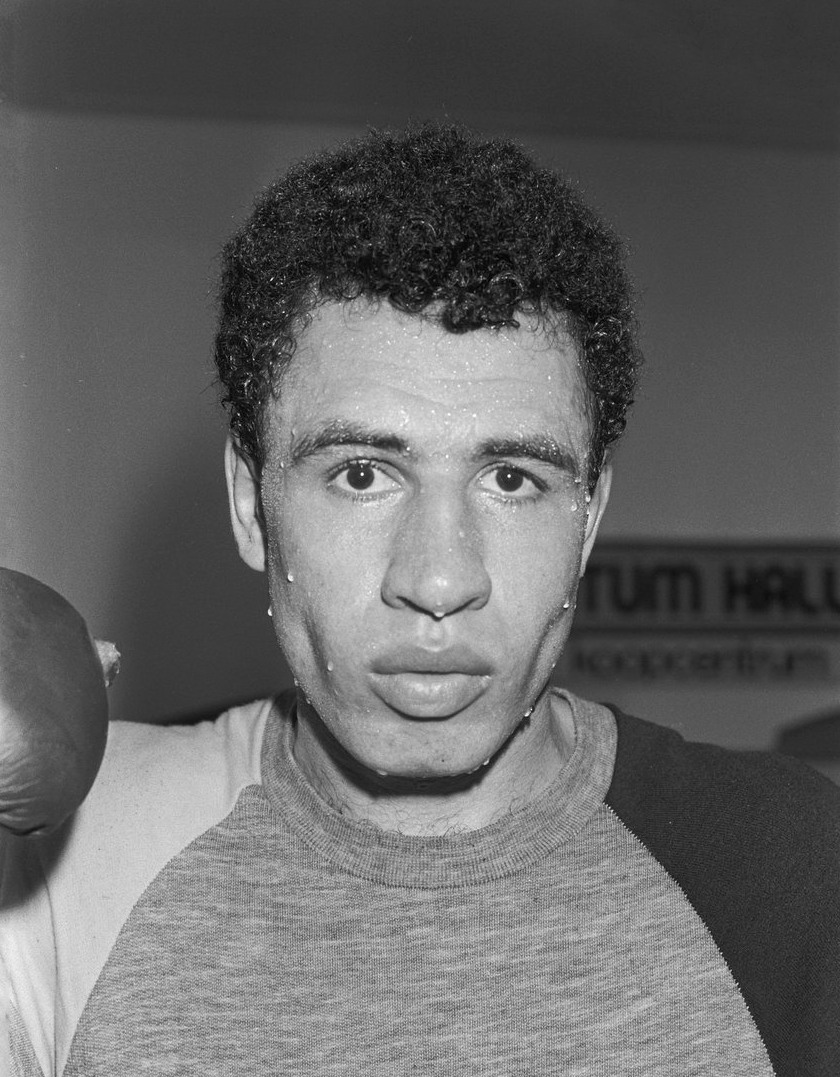
- Blanchard in 1984

Personal information
- Nationality: Netherlands
- Born: 3 January 1958 (age 68) Amsterdam
- Height: 194 cm (6 ft 4 in)
- Weight: 94 kg (207 lb)

Boxing career
- Weight class: Light heavyweight
- Stance: Orthodox

Boxing record
- Total fights: 48
- Wins: 40
- Win by KO: 33
- Losses: 4
- Draws: 4

Alex Blanchard (born 3 January 1958) is a retired Dutch professional boxer who was active between 1979 and 1991. Between 1985 and 1987 he was rated as world's second light heavyweight boxer by the World Boxing Council. On 29 May 1984 he won the European light heavyweight title (EBU) by knocking out Richard Caramanolis in sixth round; before the bout Caramanolis was a reigning European Champion with a 27–0 record. Blanchard defended the EBU title five times, against Manfred Jassman (1984), Richard Caramanolis (1985), Dennis Andries (1985), Ralf Rocchigiani (1986) and Enrico Scacchia (1987), and lost it in 1987 to Tom Collins. On 11 February 1985, Blanchard won the vacant World Athletic Association (WAA) title by knocking out Jerry Reddick in second round.

== Professional boxing record ==
48 fights	40 wins	4 losses
By knockout	33	4
By decision	7	0
Draws	4	

No.	Result	Record	Opponent	Type	Round, time	Date	Location	Notes
48	Loss	40–4–4	Graciano Rocchigiani	TKO	9 (12)	13 Sep 1991	Philips Halle, Düsseldorf, Germany	For European light heavyweight title
47	Win	40–3–4	Tomás Polo Ruiz	KO	4 (?)	27 May 1991	Weenahal, Rotterdam, Netherlands	
46	Win	39–3–4	Carlton Brown	KO	2 (?)	19 Nov 1990	Sportcentrum Valkencourt, Valkenswaard, Netherlands	
45	Win	38–3–4	Mike Aubrey	UD	8	22 Sep 1990	Sociëteit Philharmonie, Tilburg, Netherlands	
44	Win	37–3–4	Denys Cronin	RTD	6 (8)	7 May 1990	Rijnhal, Arnhem, Netherlands	
43	Win	36–3–4	Tony Curovic	KO	4 (?)	19 Feb 1990	Rijnhal, Arnhem, Netherlands	
42	Loss	35–3–4	Tony Harrison	TKO	2 (10)	13 Nov 1989	Houtrusthallen, The Hague, Netherlands	
41	Win	35–2–4	Peter Brown	KO	6 (8)	29 May 1989	Circustheater, The Hague, Netherlands	
40	Draw	34–2–4	Tarmo Uusivirta	SD	12	12 Dec 1988	Ice Hall, Helsinki, Finland	For inaugural IBF European super middleweight title
39	Win	34–2–3	John Held	TKO	6 (10)	7 Nov 1988	Sportpaleis Ahoy', Rotterdam, Netherlands	Won inaugural Dutch cruiserweight title
38	Win	33–2–3	Agamil Yılderım	KO	5 (?)	7 Oct 1988	Deutschlandhalle, Berlin, Germany	
37	Win	32–2–3	Jimmy Shavers	PTS	8	14 Mar 1988	Rijnhal, Arnhem, Netherlands	
36	Loss	31–2–3	Tom Collins	KO	2 (12)	11 Nov 1987	Savva's Nightclub, Usk, Wales	Lost European light heavyweight title
35	Win	31–1–3	Enrico Scacchia	TKO	9 (12)	15 Aug 1987	Bern, Canton of Bern, Switzerland	Retained European light heavyweight title
34	Win	30–1–3	Mwehu Beya	KO	7 (8)	23 Jun 1987	Paris, Île-de-France, France	
33	Win	29–1–3	Tom Collins	PTS	8	1 Dec 1986	Rijnhal, Arnhem, Netherlands	
32	Win	28–1–3	Ralf Rocchigiani	UD	12	3 Oct 1986	Berlin, Berlin State, Germany	Retained European light heavyweight title
31	Draw	27–1–3	Tarmo Uusivirta	PTS	10	26 Mar 1986	Jaap Edenhal, Amsterdam, Netherlands	
30	Draw	27–1–2	Dennis Andries	SD	12	11 Dec 1985	West Hotel, London, England	Retained European light heavyweight title
29	Draw	27–1–1	Richard Caramanolis	MD	12	22 Apr 1985	Sportpaleis Ahoy', Rotterdam, Netherlands	Retained European light heavyweight title
28	Win	27–1	Jerry Reddick	KO	2 (15)	11 Feb 1985	Jaap Edenhal, Rotterdam, Netherlands	Won inaugural WAA light heavyweight title
27	Win	26–1	Manfred Jassmann	TKO	4 (12), 1:20	15 Sep 1984	Dortmund, North Rhine-Westphalia, Germany	Retained European light heavyweight title
26	Win	25–1	Richard Caramanolis	TKO	6 (12)	28 May 1984	Jaap Edenhal, Amsterdam, Netherlands	Won European light heavyweight title
25	Win	24–1	Sergio Bosio	KO	3 (8)	18 Nov 1983	Middelkerke, West Flanders, Belgium	
24	Win	23–1	James Churn	KO	3 (8)	17 Oct 1983	Congresgebouw, The Hague, Netherlands	
23	Win	22–1	José Seys	TKO	10 (10)	18 Jun 1983	Izegem, West Flanders, Belgium	Retained BeNeLux light heavyweight title
22	Loss	21–1	Rudy Koopmans	TKO	8 (12)	15 Nov 1982	Sportpaleis Ahoy', Rotterdam, Netherlands	For European light heavyweight title
21	Win	21–0	Hendrik Seys	TKO	2 (12)	6 Sep 1982	De Doelen, Rotterdam, Netherlands	Won BeNeLux light heavyweight title
20	Win	20–0	Rudy Robles	TKO	5 (10)	24 May 1982	IJsselhal, Rotterdam, Netherlands	
19	Win	19–0	Ennio Cometti	TKO	6 (10)	2 Nov 1981	Maashal, Rotterdam, Netherlands	
18	Win	18–0	Andre Mongelema	TKO	5 (8)	5 Oct 1981	Sportpaleis Ahoy', Rotterdam, Netherlands	
17	Win	17–0	Doug Demmings	KO	6 (10)	7 Sep 1981	Sportpaleis Ahoy', Rotterdam, Netherlands	
16	Win	16–0	Earl Edwards	KO	3 (10)	16 Mar 1981	Congresgebouw, The Hague, Netherlands	
15	Win	15–0	José Lozano	PTS	10	2 Mar 1981	Sportpaleis Ahoy', Rotterdam, Netherlands	
14	Win	14–0	Michel Pagani	KO	1 (?)	20 Oct 1980	Sportpaleis Ahoy', Rotterdam, Netherlands	
13	Win	13–0	Bonny McKenzie	PTS	8	29 Sep 1980	Energiehal, Rotterdam, Netherlands	
12	Win	12–0	Franz Dorfer	KO	3 (?)	1 Sep 1980	Energiehal, Rotterdam, Netherlands	
11	Win	11–0	Gregory Marshall	KO	2 (?)	13 Jun 1980	Lübeck, Schleswig-Holstein, Germany	
10	Win	10–0	Michael Chapier	TKO	6 (10)	19 May 1980	Ton Menkenhal, Rotterdam, Netherlands	
9	Win	9–0	Billy Lauder	KO	4 (8)	28 Apr 1980	Jaap Edenhal, Amsterdam, Netherlands	
8	Win	8–0	Oscar Angus	KO	2 (8)	31 Mar 1980	Sportpaleis Ahoy', Rotterdam, Netherlands	
7	Win	7–0	Mike McCoy	KO	2 (?)	28 Jan 1980	Sportpaleis Ahoy', Rotterdam, Netherlands	
6	Win	6–0	Josef Kossmann	RTD	1 (?)	26 Nov 1979	Schiehal, Rotterdam, Netherlands	
5	Win	5–0	Etienne Bayadikilla	TKO	4 (?)	5 Nov 1979	Sportpaleis Ahoy', Rotterdam, Netherlands	
4	Win	4–0	Jean-Luc Lami	KO	2 (?)	28 May 1979	Jaap Edenhal, Amsterdam, Netherlands	
3	Win	3–0	Sonny Kamunga	PTS	6	26 Mar 1979	Martinihal, Groningen, Netherlands	
2	Win	2–0	Rainer Gutekunst	TKO	3 (?)	7 Mar 1979	Sportpaleis Ahoy', Rotterdam, Netherlands	
1	Win	1–0	Klaus Hein	KO	4 (?)	8 Jan 1979	Sportpaleis Ahoy', Rotterdam, Netherlands	
