= WHNR =

- Cypress Gardens, Florida; United States
- Broadcast area: Lakeland, Florida
- Frequency: 1360 kHz
- Branding: Boss Hogg Radio

Programming
- Format: Variety (classic country, oldies)
- Affiliations: Fox News Radio; Premiere Networks

Ownership
- Owner: Ferris Waller; (Walco Enterprises, LLC)
- Sister stations: WAVP; WKFL; WWAB; WZHR

History
- First air date: December 29, 1958 (as WINT Winter Haven)
- Former call signs: WINT (1958–1972); WZNG (1972–1983); WYXY (1983–1990)

Technical information
- Licensing authority: FCC
- Facility ID: 21766
- Class: B
- Power: 5,000 watts day; 2,500 watts night
- Transmitter coordinates: 28°1′17.1″N 81°42′1.3″W
- Repeaters: 1170 WKFL (Bushnell); 1330 WWAB (Lakeland); 1390 WAVP (Avon Park); 1400 WZHR (Zephyrhills)

Links
- Public license information: Public file; LMS
- Webcast: Listen live
- Website: www.bosshoggradio.net

WHNR (1360 AM) is a commercial radio station licensed to Cypress Gardens, Florida, and serving the Lakeland - Winter Haven area of Central Florida. The station airs a variety radio format and is owned by Ferris Waller, through licensee Walco Enterprises, LLC. WHNR is part of a five-station simulcast, including 1170 WKFL in Bushnell, 1330 WWAB in Lakeland, 1390 WAVP in Avon Park, and 1400 WZHR in Zephyrhills.

By day, WHNR broadcasts with 5,000 watts, but to protect other stations on 1360 AM, it reduces power to 2,500 watts at night. It uses a directional antenna with a three-tower array.

== History ==
On December 29, 1958, the station signed on the air as WINT. That call sign stood for Winter Haven, its original city of license. WINT was a daytimer, transmitting with 1,000 watts by day but required to go off the air at night. The station played Top 40 music during its days as WINT.

In 1972 the station changed its call sign to WZNG playing an oldies format. On November 2, 1983, the station changed its call sign to WYXY playing an adult contemporary format (pronouncing "Wick-zee Thirteen-Sixty", the same identification as Pittsburgh Top 40 station WIXZ in the late-1960s and early-1970s). As an adult contemporary station throughout the 1980s, the station also carried Florida Gators, Miami Hurricanes, and Miami Dolphins football games, and was an affiliate of Casey Kasem's American Top 40 on weekends.

On March 16, 1990, the station changed its call sign to WHNR playing a mix of adult standards and soft adult contemporary music. The station was silent for a time in 1995 before moving to an urban adult contemporary format under the branding "Power 1360, the Soul of Central Florida".

In 1996, the station flipped to a Regional Mexican format under the branding "La Poderosa" (The Power). In 2010, the station began to air classic country from 7 p.m. to 6 a.m.

Ferris Waller's Walco Enterprises, LLC, of Plant City, Florida, made a deal to buy WHNR from Catco Communications in early December 2017. FCC approval was granted in July 2018. Waller owns several businesses in the Plant City area. The station is now being branded as "Boss Hogg Radio" and is playing a variety format known as "Heinz 57 Music". It includes classic country and oldies. The station built a remote radio studio at the Plant City Farm & Flea Market.
