= WKFL =

Simulcasts WHNR, Cypress Gardens
- Bushnell, Florida; United States
- Frequency: 1170 kHz
- Branding: Boss Hogg Radio

Programming
- Format: Variety (oldies; classic country; rockabilly)
- Affiliations: Fox News Radio; Premiere Networks

Ownership
- Owner: Ferris Waller; (Walco Enterprises, LLC)
- Sister stations: WAVP; WHNR; WWAB; WZHR

History
- First air date: October 6, 1986; 39 years ago (as WWLB)
- Former call signs: WWLB (1986–1987); WBEA (1987–1987)

Technical information
- Licensing authority: FCC
- Facility ID: 62365
- Class: D
- Power: 1,000 watts day
- Transmitter coordinates: 28°42′31.97″N 82°7′35.31″W

Links
- Public license information: Public file; LMS
- Webcast: Listen live
- Website: www.bosshoggradio.com

WKFL (1170 AM) is a daytimer radio station licensed to Bushnell, Florida. It is owned by Ferris Waller, through licensee Walco Enterprises, LLC. WKFL is part of the "Boss Hogg" radio network, simulcasting a variety radio format, including oldies, classic country and rockabilly hits of the 1960s, 70s and 80s. Other Boss Hogg stations include WHNR in Cypress Gardens, WWAB in Lakeland, WAVP in Avon Park, and WZHR in Zephyrhills. Most hours begin with an update from Fox News Radio.

WKFL is a Class D AM station. By day, it is powered at 1,000 watts non-directional. As 1170 AM is a clear channel frequency reserved for Class A stations KOTV in Tulsa and WWVA in Wheeling, WKFL must leave the air at sunset to avoid interference. The transmitter is off SW 112th Avenue at Interstate 75.

== History ==
The station went on the air as WWLB on October 6, 1986, licensed to Wildwood. On September 4, 1987, the station changed its call sign to WBEA, and on November 9, 1987, to the current WKFL.
