= Lüssow =

Lüssow may refer to the following places in Mecklenburg-Vorpommern, Germany:

- Lüssow, Güstrow, a municipality in the district of Rostock
- Lüssow, Nordvorpommern, a municipality in the district Vorpommern-Rügen
- Lüssow (Gützkow), a village in the municipality Gützkow, in the district Vorpommern-Greifswald
