= WWAB =

Radio station in Lakeland, Florida, United States

Coordinates: 28°2′41.1″N 81°58′27.3″W

Simulcasts WHNR, Cypress Gardens
- Lakeland, Florida; United States
- Broadcast area: Lakeland area
- Frequency: 1330 kHz
- Branding: Boss Hogg Radio

Programming
- Format: Variety
- Affiliations: Fox News Radio; Premiere Networks

Ownership
- Owner: Ferris Waller; (Walco Enterprises, LLC)
- Sister stations: WKFL; WHNR; WAVP; WZHR

History
- First air date: 1957
- Former call signs: WYSE (1957–1963)

Technical information
- Licensing authority: FCC
- Facility ID: 54837
- Class: D
- Power: 1,000 watts day; 118 watts night

Links
- Public license information: Public file; LMS
- Webcast: Listen live
- Website: bosshoggradio.com

WWAB (1330 AM) is a radio station broadcasting a variety format. Licensed to Lakeland, Florida, United States, the station is owned by Walco Enterprises, LLC.

== History ==
=== Syndication ===
WWAB was the originating station of “Straight Talk” and “Conceived in Liberty”, both hosted by Jerry Hughes. The shows were distributed nationally via the Accent Radio Network. Hughes died aged 62 on June 1, 2012.
