= Markus Bott =

German boxer

Personal information
- Nickname: Cassius
- Nationality: (Germany) German
- Born: Markus Bott; January 13, 1962 (age 64) Pforzheim, West Germany
- Height: 6 ft 0 in (183 cm)
- Weight: Cruiserweight; Heavyweight

Boxing career
- Stance: Orthodox

Boxing record
- Total fights: 33
- Wins: 28
- Win by KO: 20
- Losses: 5
Medal record
Representing West Germany
European Amateur Championships
Silver medal – second place	1985 Budapest	Light Heavyweight

Markus Bott (born 13 January 1962 in Pforzheim, West Germany) is a German former boxer. He held the WBO world cruiserweight title in 1993.

== Amateur career ==
- 1984 represented West Germany at the 1984 Los Angeles Olympic Games. Results were:
  - 1st round had a bye
  - Lost to Anton Josipović (Yugoslavia) 1-4
- 1988 represented West Germany at the 1988 Seoul Olympic Games as a Light Heavyweight. Results were:
  - Defeated René Suetovius (East Germany) RSC 3
  - Lost to Nurmagomed Shanavazov (Soviet Union) 0-5

== Professional career ==
Nicknamed "Cassius", Bott turned pro in 1989 and captured the WBO cruiserweight title with a decision win over Tyrone Booze in 1993. He lost his belt in his first defense to Nestor Hipolito Giovannini that same year via split decision. They rematched later that year, and Giovannini won via unanimous decision. Bott retired for good after a TKO loss to Lee Manuel Ossie in 1998.

== Professional boxing record ==
33 fights	28 wins	5 losses
By knockout	20	3
By decision	8	2

Result	Record	Opponent	Type	Round, time	Date	Location	Notes
Loss	28–5	(Liberia) Lee Manuel Ossie	TKO	9 (10)	1998-05-05	(France) Palais des Sport Marcel Cerdan, Paris	
Win	28–4	(Slovakia) Frantisek Vadkadi	TKO	2 (8)	1998-04-24	(Germany) Muelheim	
Win	27–4	(Germany) Frank Boehme	TKO	3 (8)	1998-03-27	(Germany) Ruelzheim	
Win	26–4	(Slovakia) Zsolt Janko	TKO	3 (8)	1998-03-07	(Germany) Koenigswinter	
Win	25–4	(Slovakia) Stefan Stanko	TKO	1 (8)	1998-01-09	(Germany) Erfurt	
Loss	24–4	(Argentina) Nestor Hipolito Giovannini	UD	12 (12)	1993-11-20	(Germany) Sporthalle, Alsterdorf	For WBO Cruiserweight title
Win	24–3	(United States) Jeff McCall	KO	1 (10)	1993-10-02	(Germany) Barbarossa Halle, Kaiserslautern	
Loss	23–3	(Argentina) Nestor Hipolito Giovannini	SD	12 (12)	1993-06-26	(Germany) Sporthalle, Alsterdorf	Lost WBO Cruiserweight title
Win	23–2	(United States) Tyrone Booze	UD	12 (12)	1993-02-13	(Germany) Sporthalle, Alsterdorf	Won WBO Cruiserweight title
Win	22–2	(United States) Jeff Bowman	KO	1 (8)	1992-12-08	(Germany) Legien Center, Mitte	
Win	21–2	(United States) Ken Bentley	PTS	8 (8)	1992-11-17	(Germany) Holstentorhalle, Luebeck	
Win	20–2	(United States) David Bates	TKO	5 (8)	1992-09-29	(Germany) Green's Club, Hamburg	
Win	19–2	(United States) Tim Knight	TKO	4 (8)	1992-08-28	(Germany) Tivoli Eissporthalle, Aachen	
Win	18–2	(Jamaica) Cordwell Hylton	PTS	8 (8)	1992-02-21	(Germany) Legien Center, Mitte	
Win	17–2	(United States) Rick Enis	RTD	7 (10)	1992-01-28	(Germany) Legien Center, Mitte	
Win	16–2	(United States) Mike DeVito	TKO	4 (8)	1992-01-10	(Germany) Saaltheater Geulen, Aachen	
Win	15–2	(Turkey) Erol Ilter	TKO	1 (8)	1991-12-13	(Germany) Minden	
Loss	14–2	(United Kingdom) Michael Murray	TKO	7 (8)	1991-10-15	Germany	
Win	14–1	(United States) Eddie Curry	KO	1 (8)	1991-09-16	(Germany) Legien Center, Mitte	
Win	13–1	(United States) David McCluskey	TKO	4 (8)	1991-06-28	(Germany) Dinslaken	
Win	12–1	(Germany) Ralf Rocchigiani	PTS	10 (10)	1991-05-03	(Germany) Legien Center, Mitte	
Win	11–1	(United Kingdom) Gary McCrory	PTS	8 (8)	1991-04-05	(Germany) Legien Center, Mitte	
Loss	10–1	(United Kingdom) Johnny Nelson	TKO	12 (12)	1990-12-14	(Germany) Europahalle, Karlsruhe	
Win	10–0	(United States) David Butler	KO	2 (8)	1990-11-16	(Germany) Sporthalle, Wandsbek	
Win	9–0	(United States) Rick Kellar	KO	3 (8)	1990-10-05	(Germany) Philips Halle, Düsseldorf	
Win	8–0	(Mexico) Jose Mireles	TKO	4 (8)	1990-09-07	(Germany) Sporthalle Charlottenburg, Charlottenburg	
Win	7–0	(Germany) Manfred Jassmann	PTS	10 (10)	1990-06-01	(Germany) Philips Halle, Düsseldorf	
Win	6–0	(United Kingdom) Mike Aubrey	PTS	8 (8)	1990-05-05	(Germany) Sporthalle, Wandsbek	
Win	5–0	(United States) Matthew Saad Muhammad	TKO	3 (8)	1990-02-16	(Germany) Sporthalle, Wandsbek	
Win	4–0	(Jamaica) Lennie Howard	TKO	2 (8)	1989-12-16	(Germany) Jahnhalle, Pforzheim	
Win	3–0	(United States) Andre Crowder	KO	1 (6)	1989-12-01	(Germany) Inter-Continental Hotel, Mitte	
Win	2–0	(Belgium) Yves Monsieur	TKO	1 (6)	1989-09-30	(Germany) Sporthalle, Wandsbek	
Win	1–0	(Suriname) John Held	PTS	6 (6)	1989-06-30	(Germany) Sporthalle, Wandsbek	Professional debut

== See also ==
- List of cruiserweight boxing champions

Achievements
Preceded by Tyrone Booze	WBO cruiserweight champion February 13, 1993 – June 26, 1993	Succeeded by Nestor Hipolito Giovannini
