= Doug Demmings =

American boxer

Doug Demmings (May 9, 1951 – March 24, 2002) was an American professional boxer who competed from 1973 to 1983.

== Professional boxing career ==
Demmings' career began in inauspicious fashion with two losses in his first four fights, before he began an unbeaten streak that ran to 19 bouts over three years. Demmings then fought Sugar Ray Seales for the USBA middleweight title, a bout which he lost in a 15-round decision. Demmings would subsequently fight (and lose to) "Marvelous" Marvin Hagler, Alan Minter, Dwight Davison, Wayne Caplett (three times), Alex Blanchard, and John "The Beast" Mugabi. At the time of his retirement in 1983 Demmings had compiled a record of 31-12 with 14 wins by knockout.

== After Boxing ==
Demmings died in 2002 from pancreatic cancer, and was buried in full boxing gear. He was posthumously inducted into the Minnesota Boxing Hall of Fame in 2013.
