= Ralf Rocchigiani =

German boxer

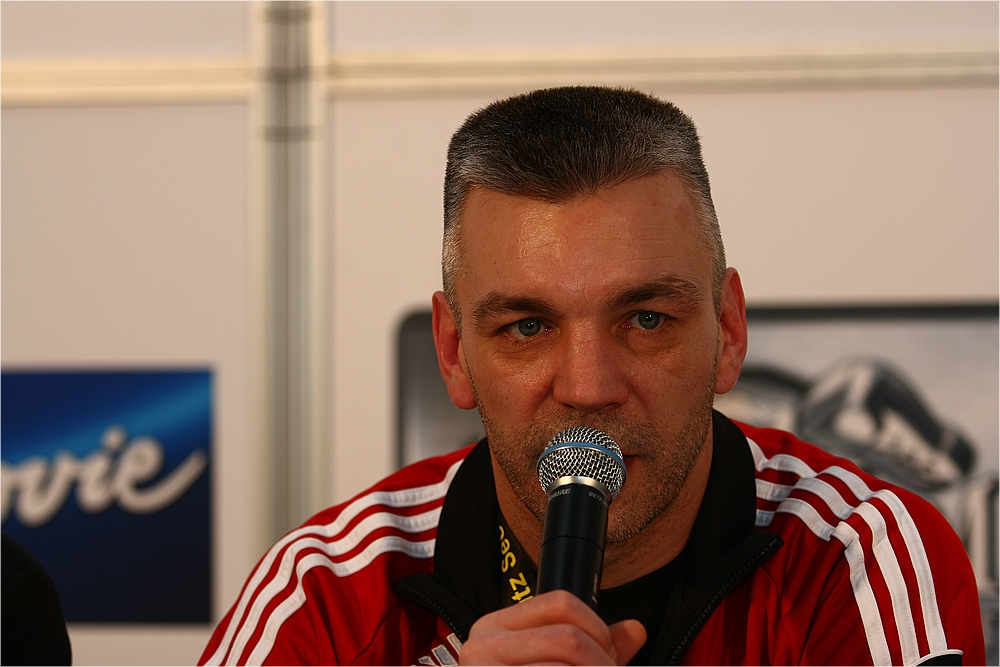

Personal information
- Nickname: Rocky II
- Nationality: German
- Born: 13 February 1963 (age 63) Duisburg, West Germany (now Germany)
- Height: 6 ft 0 in (183 cm)
- Weight: Light heavyweight; Cruiserweight; Heavyweight

Boxing career
- Stance: Orthodox

Boxing record
- Total fights: 58
- Wins: 42
- Win by KO: 17
- Losses: 9
- Draws: 7

Ralf Rocchigiani (born 13 February 1963) is a German former professional boxer who competed from 1983 to 1999. He held the World Boxing Organisation (WBO) cruiserweight title from 1995 to 1997. At regional level, he held the German title twice between 1985 and 1994. He is the older brother of former two-division world champion boxer, Graciano Rocchigiani.

== Professional career ==
He became a professional boxer in 1983 and won the German cruiserweight championship in 1985. He failed in two attempts to win the European Boxing Union light heavyweight championships. He also failed to take the WBO cruiserweight championship from Tyrone Booze in 1992.

He finally won the WBO cruiserweight championship on June 10, 1995, and held it for more than two years. He won the vacant title by scoring a technical knockout over Carl Thompson, and defended it six times including against Bash Ali. He lost the title in a rematch with Thompson in 1997 and retired from boxing in 1999. Rocchigiani was contractually signed to German boxing promoter Klaus-Peter Kohl and his company "Universum Boxpromotions." He was trained by Fritz Sdunek.

== Professional boxing record ==
| 58 fights | 42 wins | 9 losses |
|---|---|---|
| By knockout | 17 | 0 |
| By decision | 24 | 9 |
| By disqualification | 1 | 0 |
| Draws | 7 | |

| No. | Result | Record | Opponent | Type | Round, time | Date | Location | Notes |
|---|---|---|---|---|---|---|---|---|
| 58 | Win | 42–9–7 | Andreas Wornowski | TKO | 6 (?) | 18 Sep 1999 | Stadthalle, Rostock, Germany | |
| 57 | Win | 41–9–7 | Andreas Wornowski | PTS | 8 (8) | 6 Dec 1998 | Prague, Czech Republic | |
| 56 | Loss | 40–9–7 | Carl Thompson | SD | 12 (12) | 4 Oct 1997 | Stadionsporthalle, Hanover, Germany | Lost WBO cruiserweight title |
| 55 | Win | 40–8–7 | Stefan Angehrn | MD | 12 (12) | 26 Apr 1997 | Hallenstadion, Zurich, Switzerland | Retained WBO cruiserweight title |
| 54 | Win | 39–8–7 | Stefan Angehrn | UD | 12 (12) | 13 Dec 1996 | Stadionsporthalle, Hanover, Germany | Retained WBO cruiserweight title |
| 53 | Win | 38–8–7 | Bash Ali | UD | 12 (12) | 13 Jul 1996 | Grugahalle, Essen, Germany | Retained WBO cruiserweight title |
| 52 | Win | 37–8–7 | Jay Snyder | TKO | 4 (12) | 16 Mar 1996 | Deutschlandhalle, Berlin, Germany | Retained WBO cruiserweight title |
| 51 | Win | 36–8–7 | Dan Ward | TKO | 8 (12) | 25 Nov 1995 | Stadthalle, Braunschweig, Germany | Retained WBO cruiserweight title |
| 50 | Win | 35–8–7 | Marc Randazzo | UD | 12 (12) | 30 Sep 1995 | Stadionsporthalle, Hanover, Germany | Retained WBO cruiserweight title |
| 49 | Win | 34–8–7 | Carl Thompson | TKO | 11 (12) | 10 Jun 1995 | G-Mex Centre, Manchester, England | Won vacant WBO cruiserweight title |
| 48 | Win | 33–8–7 | Terrence Wright | UD | 8 (8) | 12 Feb 1995 | Universum Gym, Hamburg, Germany | |
| 47 | Loss | 32–8–7 | Torsten May | PTS | 10 (10) | 7 May 1994 | Oberwerth Halle, Koblenz, Germany | Lost BDB German cruiserweight title |
| 46 | Win | 32–7–7 | Tim Knight | PTS | 8 (8) | 5 Feb 1994 | Deutschlandhalle, Berlin, Germany | |
| 45 | Draw | 31–7–7 | Tony Booth | PTS | 8 (8) | 1 May 1993 | Sporthalle Charlottenburg, Berlin, Germany | |
| 44 | Win | 31–7–6 | David Bates | PTS | 8 (8) | 3 Apr 1993 | Sporthalle Wandsbek, Hamburg, Germany | |
| 43 | Win | 30–7–6 | Rick Enis | KO | 5 (?) | 19 Dec 1992 | Germany | |
| 42 | Win | 29–7–6 | Melvin Ricks | KO | 4 (?) | 27 Nov 1992 | Suhl, Germany | |
| 41 | Loss | 28–7–6 | Tyrone Booze | UD | 12 (12) | 2 Oct 1992 | Deutschlandhalle, Berlin, Germany | For WBO cruiserweight title |
| 40 | Win | 28–6–6 | Dawud Shaw | KO | 3 (8) | 27 Jun 1992 | Halle, Germany | |
| 39 | Win | 27–6–6 | John Held | PTS | 10 (10) | 25 Apr 1992 | Germany | |
| 38 | Loss | 26–6–6 | John Held | PTS | 10 (10) | 3 Mar 1992 | Jaap Edenhal, Amsterdam, Netherlands | For vacant BeNeLux cruiserweight title |
| 37 | Loss | 26–5–6 | Markus Bott | PTS | 10 (10) | 3 May 1991 | Legien Center, Berlin, Germany | For BDB German heavyweight title |
| 36 | Loss | 26–4–6 | John Held | PTS | 8 (8) | 16 Feb 1990 | Sporthalle Wandsbek, Hamburg, Germany | |
| 35 | Win | 26–3–6 | Klaus Winter | KO | 3 (10) | 1 Dec 1989 | Inter-Continental Hotel, Berlin, Germany | Won BDB German cruiserweight title |
| 34 | Loss | 25–3–6 | John Emmen | PTS | 10 (10) | 30 Sep 1989 | Sporthalle Wandsbek, Hamburg, Germany | |
| 33 | Win | 25–2–6 | Bernd Kulle | PTS | 4 (4) | 8 Jul 1989 | Süpplingen, Germany | |
| 32 | Draw | 24–2–6 | Jan Lefeber | SD | 12 (12) | 8 Apr 1989 | Palais am Funkturm, Berlin, Germany | For European light-heavyweight title |
| 31 | Win | 24–2–5 | Jan Lefeber | PTS | 8 (8) | 29 Jul 1988 | Timmendorfer Strand, Germany | |
| 30 | Win | 23–2–5 | Vedat Akova | TKO | 2 (?) | 12 May 1988 | Germany | |
| 29 | Win | 22–2–5 | Marvin Camel | PTS | 10 (10) | 26 Apr 1988 | Cologne, Germany | |
| 28 | Draw | 21–2–5 | Agamil Yilderim | PTS | 8 (8) | 19 Feb 1988 | Germany | |
| 27 | Win | 21–2–4 | Alex Zeh | KO | 9 (10) | 23 Jan 1988 | Sporthalle Wandsbek, Hamburg, Germany | Retained BDB German cruiserweight title |
| 26 | Win | 20–2–4 | Chisanda Mutti | PTS | 10 (10) | 5 Dec 1987 | Philips Halle, Düsseldorf, Germany | |
| 25 | Win | 19–2–4 | Tommy Taylor | PTS | 8 (8) | 30 Oct 1987 | Kurfürstliches Schloss, Mainz, Germany | |
| 24 | Win | 18–2–4 | Manfred Jassmann | PTS | 10 (10) | 25 Sep 1987 | Germany | Retained BDB German cruiserweight title |
| 23 | Draw | 17–2–4 | Alex Zeh | PTS | 10 (10) | 27 Feb 1987 | Sporthalle Wandsbek, Hamburg, Germany | Retained BDB German cruiserweight title |
| 22 | Loss | 17–2–3 | Alex Blanchard | UD | 12 (12) | 3 Oct 1986 | Germany | For European light-heavyweight title |
| 21 | Win | 17–1–3 | Mladen Grubešić | KO | 2 (?) | 12 May 1986 | Tennis Stab Verein, Bad Homburg, Germany | |
| 20 | Win | 16–1–3 | Dragomir Milo Popović | DQ | 7 (?) | 1 Mar 1986 | Cologne, Germany | |
| 19 | Win | 15–1–3 | Ibelo Moano | PTS | 8 (8) | 20 Dec 1985 | Rüsselsheim am Main, Germany | |
| 18 | Win | 14–1–3 | Tom Collins | PTS | 8 (8) | 29 Nov 1985 | Frankfurt, Germany | |
| 17 | Win | 13–1–3 | Jose Seys | SD | 8 (8) | 31 Aug 1985 | Berlin, Germany | |
| 16 | Win | 12–1–3 | Josef Kossmann | TKO | 2 (10) | 21 Aug 1985 | Tennis Stab Verein, Bad Homburg, Germany | Won vacant BDB German cruiserweight title |
| 15 | Draw | 11–1–3 | Manfred Jassmann | SD | 10 (10) | 10 May 1985 | Germany | For BDB German light-heavyweight title |
| 14 | Loss | 11–1–2 | Manfred Jassmann | PTS | 10 (10) | 1 Dec 1984 | Düsseldorf, Germany | For BDB German light-heavyweight title |
| 13 | Draw | 11–0–2 | Paul Muyodi | PTS | 6 (6) | 20 Oct 1984 | Bad Salzuflen, Germany | |
| 12 | Win | 11–0–1 | Trevor Cattouse | KO | 3 (8) | 5 Oct 1984 | Festhalle, Frankfurt, Germany | |
| 11 | Win | 10–0–1 | Juan Alberto Barrero | PTS | 6 (6) | 15 Sep 1984 | Dortmund, Germany | |
| 10 | Win | 9–0–1 | Brahim Ferizovic | TKO | 3 (?) | 22 Jun 1984 | Munich, Germany | |
| 9 | Win | 8–0–1 | Mladen Grubešić | PTS | 6 (6) | 8 Jun 1984 | Baunatal, Germany | |
| 8 | Draw | 7–0–1 | Liam Coleman | PTS | 6 (6) | 27 Apr 1984 | Germany | |
| 7 | Win | 7–0 | Mike McCoy | PTS | 6 (6) | 13 Apr 1984 | Ischelandhalle, Hagen, Germany | |
| 6 | Win | 6–0 | Francesco Campi | RTD | 3 (?) | 9 Mar 1984 | Frankfurt, Germany | |
| 5 | Win | 5–0 | Helmut Ulka | UD | 4 (4) | 24 Feb 1984 | Alsterdorfer Sporthalle, Hamburg, Germany | |
| 4 | Win | 4–0 | Alan Ash | PTS | 6 (6) | 10 Feb 1984 | Sporthalle Süd, Frankfurt, Germany | |
| 3 | Win | 3–0 | Eddy Vandenhouwele | PTS | 4 (4) | 14 Jan 1984 | Düsseldorf, Germany | |
| 2 | Win | 2–0 | Horst Schulze | TKO | 1 (4) | 2 Dec 1983 | Hanns-Martin-Schleyer-Halle, Stuttgart, Germany | |
| 1 | Win | 1–0 | Hans Gimborn | KO | 1 (?) | 5 Nov 1983 | Mannheim, Germany | |

== Later life ==
Today Rocchigiani owns a bar on the Savignyplatz in Berlin. He also served as a trainer for his brother Graciano Rocchigiani.

== See also ==
- List of male boxers
- Notable boxing families
- List of world cruiserweight boxing champions

Sporting positions
Regional boxing titles
| New title | BDB German cruiserweight champion 21 August 1985 – 1988; Vacated | Vacant Title next held by Klaus Winter |
| Preceded by Klaus Winter | BDB German cruiserweight champion 1 December 1989 – 7 May 1994 | Succeeded by Torsten May |
World boxing titles
| Vacant Title last held by Dariusz Michalczewski | WBO cruiserweight champion 10 June 1995 – 4 October 1997 | Succeeded by Carl Thompson |
