= Fritz Sdunek =

East German boxer

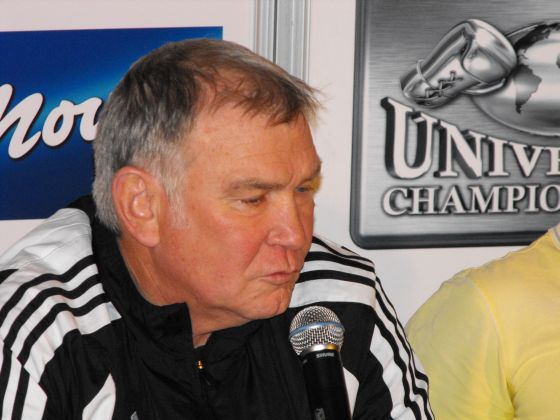
Sdunek in 2009

Fritz Sdunek (German pronunciation: [ˈzduːnɛk]; 18 April 1947 – 22 December 2014) was a German professional boxing trainer and previously an amateur boxer. Regarded as one of the most successful and famous boxing trainers, he trained, among others, such world champions as Wladimir and Vitali Klitschko and Dariusz Michalczewski. He was born in Lüssow, East Germany.

== Sport career ==
Fritz Sdunek's career started in amateur boxing. Its highlight was a victory at a Students Championship of East Germany in 1968. He won 99 of his 129 amateur fights, then decided to become a trainer.

In 1979 he graduated from the Deutsche Hochschule für Körperkultur (a university) with a diploma as a sport teacher.

Since the 1960s Sdunek was a member of a sport club Traktor Schwerin, where he also worked as a trainer until 1989. There he trained among others Andreas Zülow, who won a gold medal (lightweight) at 1988 Summer Olympics in Seoul.

From 1994 until his death in 2014 Sdunek was active as a trainer for a famous Hamburg boxing promotion organization Universum Box-Promotion.

== Private life ==
Fritz Sdunek was born in 1947 in post-World War II Germany, on a territory which soon became East Germany. His birthplace is the village of Lüssow near the Baltic Sea, today part of Mecklenburg-Vorpommern.

Sdunek was married and had two children - a son and a daughter. His daughter was married to Ahmet Öner, a German of Turkish descent, head of Hamburg professional promotional firm Arena Box-Promotion and ex-professional boxer.

== Death ==
He died in a hospital in Hamburg on 22 December 2014, at the age of 67 following a heart attack he had suffered earlier on the island of Gran Canaria.

== Boxers trained by Fritz Sdunek ==
Fritz Sdunek trained many boxers, both professional and amateur.

Previously trained:

- (Ukraine) Vitali Klitschko
- (Hungary) Zsolt Erdei
- (Germany) Felix Sturm
- (United Kingdom) Ola Afolabi
- (Ukraine) Wladimir Klitschko
- (Germany) (Poland) Dariusz Michalczewski
- (Cuba) Juan Carlos Gómez
- (Germany) Artur Grigorian
- (Germany) Ralf Rocchigiani
- (Germany) Thomas Ulrich
- (Hungary) István Kovács
- (Romania) Mihai Leu
- (Hungary) Károly Balzsay
- (Germany) Sebastian Zbik
- (Germany) Mario Veit
- (Germany) (Ukraine) Alexander Dimitrenko
- (Russia) Denis Boytsov
- (Armenia) Khoren Gevor
- (Turkey) Sinan Şamil Sam
- (Russia) Akhmed Kotiev
- (Russia) Grigory Drozd
- (Russia) Aleksandr Alekseyev
- (East Germany) Andreas Zülow
- (Serbia) Nenad Borovčanin

== Sources ==
- Information about Fritz Sdunek on the web site of Universum Box-Promotion — source for most of the facts featured in this article
