= WAVP =

Radio station in Avon Park, Florida

Simulcasts WHNR, Cypress Gardens
- Avon Park, Florida; United States
- Broadcast area: Sebring, Florida
- Frequency: 1390 kHz
- Branding: Boss Hogg Radio

Programming
- Format: Variety
- Affiliations: Fox News Radio; Premiere Networks

Ownership
- Owner: Ferris S. Waller, Sr.; (Walco Enterprises, LLC)
- Sister stations: WHNR; WKFL; WWAB; WZHR

History
- First air date: October 1, 1970
- Former call signs: WAPR (1970–1993); WKHF (1993–1994); WAVP (1994–2006); WFHT (2006–2020)
- Call sign meaning: Avon Park

Technical information
- Licensing authority: FCC
- Facility ID: 72684
- Class: D
- Power: 1,000 watts day; 77 watts night
- Transmitter coordinates: 27°37′5.1″N 81°29′48.3″W
- Translator: 107.5 W298BU (Avon Park)

Links
- Public license information: Public file; LMS
- Webcast: Listen live
- Website: www.bosshoggradio.com

WAVP (1390 AM) is a radio station licensed to Avon Park, Florida. WAVP is owned by Ferris Waller, through licensee Walco Enterprises, LLC, and operates with 1,000 watts day and 77 watts at night. The station is known on-air as Boss Hogg Radio.

== History ==
The station's frequency was previously occupied by an earlier radio station with the WAVP call sign.

WAVP began broadcasting October 1, 1970, as WAPR. In 1992, the owner was Andrew Banas who bought the station for $100,000 in September 1990. As WFHT, the station went silent on October 1, 2009, according to Federal Communications Commission records, but was resurrected in early 2010.

WFHT until January 2015 aired a nationally syndicated talk show lineup that included Neal Boortz, Michael Savage, Mark Levin, and Phil Hendrie Mondays through Fridays, and specialty talk shows on the weekends. WFHT was also an affiliate of the Tampa Bay Rays baseball team, the Tampa Bay Lightning hockey team, and NFL and NCAA football games; the former talk station also featured local talk shows. In 2015, WFHT began broadcasting Florida A&M Rattlers football games via the "Rattler Football Network".

From 2015 to 2020, the station broadcast an urban AC–urban contemporary gospel format. This ended when the station was sold to Walco Enterprises and began simulcasting the other three Boss Hogg Radio stations owned by the company, reclaiming the WAVP call sign it had used for most of its history until the mid-2000s.

== Translators ==
In addition to the main station, WAVP is relayed by an FM translator.

Call sign	Frequency	City of license	FID	ERP (W)	Class	FCC info
W298BU	107.5 FM	Avon Park, Florida	138526	215	D	LMS
