= Christophe Girard =

French boxer

Personal information
- Nationality: French
- Born: Christophe Girard; July 21, 1967 (age 59) Blois, France
- Weight: Light heavyweight, Cruiserweight

Boxing career
- Stance: Orthodox

Boxing record
- Total fights: 46
- Wins: 40
- Win by KO: 12
- Losses: 6

Christophe Girard (born July 21, 1967) is a French former boxer who fought at light heavyweight and cruiserweight. Girard challenged for a world title on three occasions, twice against Dariusz Michalczewski in 1996 for the WBO Light-Heavyweight title and against Johnny Nelson for the WBO Cruiserweight title in 1999.

Christophe is the older brother of two weight World Champion Bruno Girard.

== Career ==
Girard made his debut in 1988. In his tenth fight he became French Light-Heavyweight champion. In 1992 unsuccessfully fought Tom Collins for the European Light Heavyweight Title, suffering his first defeat. After building up a record 30-1, Girard would challenge for that same European title again and was defeated by Dutchman Eddy Smulders.

In June 1996 Girard challenged the eventually undisputed champion Dariusz Michalczewski for the WBO title in Cologne. Girard lost by unanimous decision but was given a rematch. Six months later the rematch took place in Hannover, this time Girard suffered an eighth round knockout defeat.

Girard moved up to cruiserweight and had initial success, beating Antoine Palatis to become French champion. In 1999 Girard went back to Germany to face Alexey Ilyin for the vacant European Cruiserweight title but was stopped in the tenth.

Despite the loss at European level, Girard was chosen to face Johnny Nelson for his WBO Cruiserweight Title and was stopped in the fourth.

Girard won three more fights in France before retiring.
