= Leeonzer Barber =

American boxer

Leeonzer Barber (born February 18, 1966, in Detroit) was an American professional boxer who held the WBO light-heavyweight title from 1991 to 1994.

== Professional career ==
Barber turned pro in 1986. In just his 13th fight he won the vacant WBO light-heavyweight title with a TKO win over Tom Collins in Leeds, England in 1991. He defended the title four times before losing the belt by a unanimous decision to Dariusz Michalczewski at Sporthalle, Alsterdorf, Hamburg, Germany in 1994.

His pro record was 21–4 with 13 knockouts.

== See also ==
- List of WBO world champions
- List of light-heavyweight boxing champions

Preceded by Michael Moorer vacated	WBO Light heavyweight Champion; 9 May 1991–10 Sep 1994	Succeeded by Dariusz Michalczewski
