= Aldo Traversaro =

Italian boxer

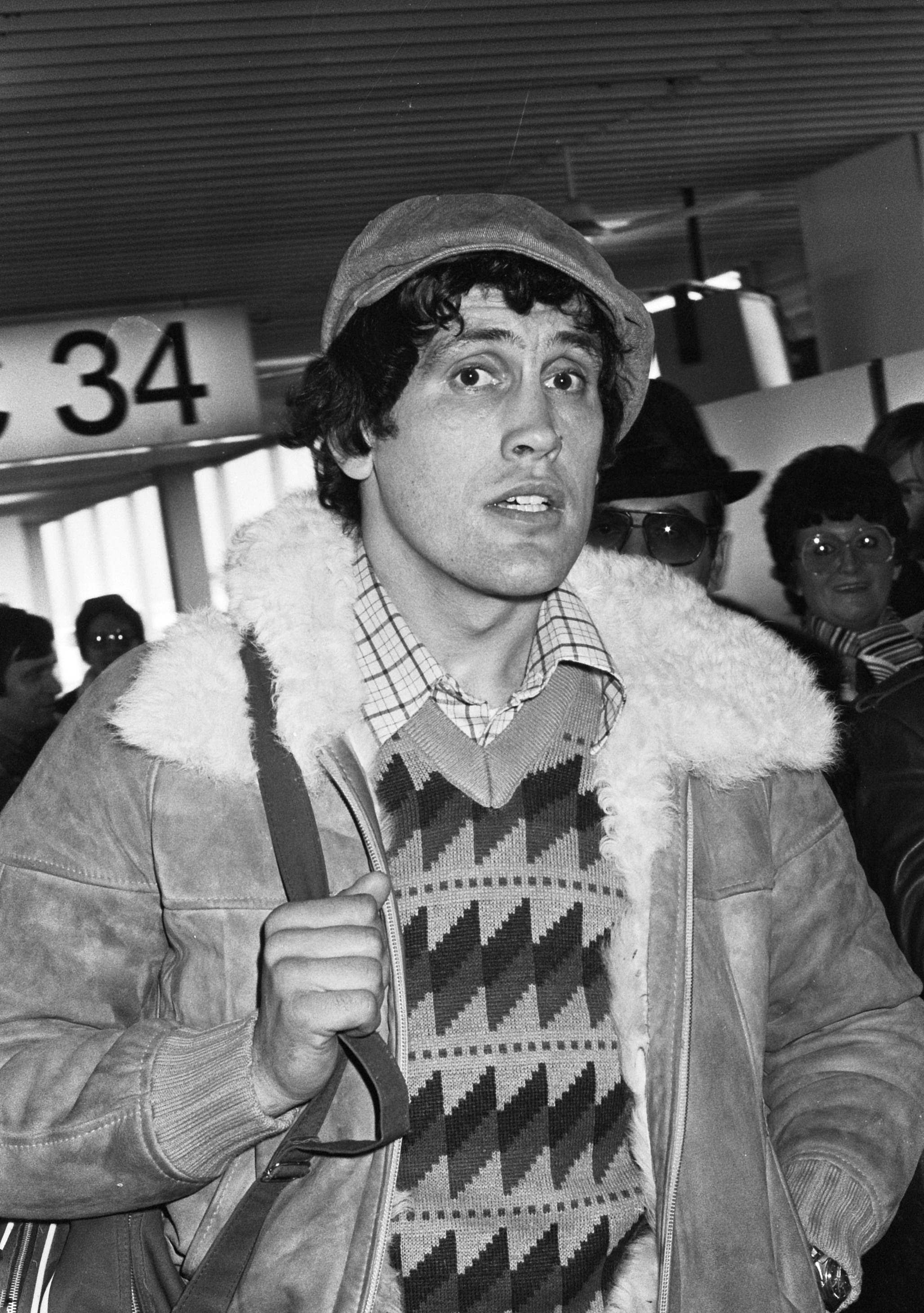
- Aldo Traversaro in 1979

Personal information
- Nationality: Italy
- Born: 26 July 1948 (age 78) Chiavari, Italy
- Height: 1.82 m (6 ft 0 in)
- Weight: Light heavyweight

Boxing career
- Stance: Orthodox

Boxing record
- Total fights: 54
- Wins: 44
- Win by KO: 31
- Losses: 4
- Draws: 6

Aldo Traversaro (born 26 July 1948) is a retired Italian professional boxer who was active between 1970 and 1979.

== Career ==
On 26 November 1977 he won the vacant European light heavyweight title (EBU) against Bunny Johnson, and defended it in 1978 against Rudy Koopmans, Francois Fiol and Avenamar Peralta. The same year he fought the WBA world title, but lost to Mike Rossman.

On 7 March 1979 Traversaro lost the EBU title to Rudy Koopmans and retired from boxing.

== Professional boxing record ==
54 fights	44 wins	4 losses
By knockout	31	3
By decision	11	1
By disqualification	2	0
Draws	6	

No.	Result	Record	Opponent	Type	Round, time	Date	Location	Notes
54	Loss	44–4–6	Rudy Koopmans	TKO	7 (15)	7 Mar 1979	Sportpaleis Ahoy', Rotterdam, Netherlands	Lost European light heavyweight title
53	Loss	44–3–6	Mike Rossman	TKO	6 (15), 1:15	5 Dec 1978	Spectrum, Philadelphia, Pennsylvania, U.S.	For WBA light heavyweight title
52	Draw	44–2–6	Avenamar Peralta	PTS	15	5 Sep 1978	Bibione, Veneto, Italy	Retained European light heavyweight title
51	Win	44–2–5	Francisco Fiol	RTD	5 (15)	28 Apr 1978	Geneva, Canton of Geneva, Switzerland	Retained European light heavyweight title
50	Draw	43–2–5	Rudy Koopmans	PTS	15	15 Feb 1978	Sportpaleis Ahoy', Rotterdam, Netherlands	Retained European light heavyweight title
49	Win	43–2–4	Bunny Johnson	TKO	11 (15)	26 Nov 1977	Palazzo Dello Sport, Genoa, Italy	Won vacant European light heavyweight title
48	Win	42–2–4	Wilbert Albers	PTS	6	17 Sep 1977	Palazzetto dello Sport, Rome, Italy	
47	Win	41–2–4	José Antonio Gálvez	TKO	5 (8)	5 Aug 1977	Sestri Levante, Liguria, Italy	
46	Win	40–2–4	Cristiano Cavina	TKO	5 (12)	11 Jun 1977	Pordenone, Friuli-Venezia Giulia, Italy	Retained Italian light heavyweight title
45	Win	39–2–4	Daniel Anekore	KO	3 (8)	15 Apr 1977	Genoa, Liguria, Italy	
44	Win	38–2–4	Onelio Grande	TKO	5 (12)	22 Jan 1977	Pordenone, Friuli-Venezia Giulia, Italy	Retained Italian light heavyweight title
43	Loss	37–2–4	Mate Parlov	MD	15	15 Oct 1976	Palasport di San Siro, Milan, Italy	For European light heavyweight title
42	Win	37–1–4	José Gálvez	TKO	4 (8)	21 Aug 1976	Chiavari, Liguria, Italy	
41	Win	36–1–4	Sergio Jannilli	TKO	5 (12)	15 Jul 1976	Vieste, Apulia, Italy	Retained Italian light heavyweight title
40	Win	35–1–4	Victor Attivor	TKO	10 (10)	14 May 1976	Rome, Lazio, Italy	
39	Win	34–1–4	Ángel Oquendo	PTS	8	3 Apr 1976	Palasport di San Siro, Milan, Italy	
38	Win	33–1–4	Jannick Dufour	TKO	2 (8)	5 Feb 1976	Palasport, Turin, Italy	
37	Win	32–1–4	Ennio Cometti	TKO	10 (12)	8 Oct 1975	Arma di Taggia, Liguria, Italy	Retained Italian light heavyweight title
36	Win	31–1–4	Onelio Grando	KO	5 (12)	9 Jul 1975	Vieste, Apulia, Italy	Retained Italian light heavyweight title
35	Win	30–1–4	Frank Evans	PTS	8	10 May 1975	Genoa, Liguria, Italy	
34	Win	29–1–4	David Adkins	PTS	8	11 Apr 1975	Bologna, Emilia-Romagna, Italy	
33	Win	28–1–4	Franco Feligioni	KO	5 (12)	14 Feb 1975	PalaLido, Milan, Italy	Retained Italian light heavyweight title
32	Draw	27–1–4	Willie Taylor	PTS	8	22 Nov 1974	Milan, Lombardy, Italy	
31	Win	27–1–3	José Antonio Gálvez	TKO	6 (8)	25 Oct 1974	Palazzo dello Sport (Pad. 3 Fiera), Milan, Italy	
30	Win	26–1–3	Mario Almanzo	TKO	5 (12)	11 Sep 1974	Rapallo, Liguria, Italy	Retained Italian light heavyweight title
29	Win	25–1–3	Ennio Cometti	TKO	10 (12)	26 Jul 1974	Sestri Levante, Liguria, Italy	Retained Italian light heavyweight title
28	Win	24–1–3	Alejandro Cardoso	TKO	5 (8)	17 May 1974	Genoa, Liguria, Italy	
27	Win	23–1–3	Walter White	TKO	4 (8)	29 Mar 1974	Palazzetto dello Sport, Rome, Italy	
26	Win	22–1–3	Manuel Quintana	DQ	6 (8)	1 Mar 1974	Genoa, Liguria, Italy	
25	Win	21–1–3	Renzo Grespan	KO	11 (12)	30 Jan 1974	Palermo, Sicily, Italy	Retained Italian light heavyweight title
24	Win	20–1–3	Jean Tshikuna	PTS	8	7 Nov 1973	Sanremo, Liguria, Italy	
23	Win	19–1–3	Domenico Adinolfi	PTS	12	25 Aug 1973	Chiavari, Liguria, Italy	Won Italian light heavyweight title
22	Draw	18–1–3	Peter Assandoh	PTS	8	4 May 1973	PalaLido, Milan, Italy	
21	Win	18–1–2	Gianfranco Macchia	PTS	8	9 Mar 1973	PalaEur, Rome, Italy	
20	Draw	17–1–2	Peter Assandoh	PTS	8	16 Nov 1972	PalaLido, Milan, Italy	
19	Draw	17–1–1	Mario Almanzo	PTS	8	19 Oct 1972	PalaLido, Milan, Italy	
18	Win	17–1	Jean Tshikuna	PTS	8	14 Aug 1972	Chiavari, Luguria, Italy	
17	Win	16–1	Raffaele Maio	TKO	4 (8)	30 May 1972	Chiavari, Liguria, Italy	
16	Win	15–1	Emilio Okee	PTS	8	9 Mar 1972	Sanremo, Liguria, Italy	
15	Loss	14–1	Emilio Okee	TKO	8 (8)	10 Feb 1972	PalaLido, Milan, Italy	
14	Win	14–0	Expedit Moutchou	PTS	8	16 Dec 1971	Rapallo, Liguria, Italy	
13	Win	13–0	Emilio Okee	PTS	6	26 Nov 1971	Palazzo Dello Sport, Turin, Italy	
12	Win	12–0	Okacha Boubekeur	TKO	4 (8)	9 Oct 1971	Palazzo Dello Sport, Genoa, Italy	
11	Win	11–0	Michel Petit	TKO	4 (8)	16 Sep 1971	PalaLido, Milan, Italy	
10	Win	10–0	Eddie Harris	KO	1 (8)	13 Aug 1971	Chiavari, Liguria, Italy	
9	Win	9–0	François Tahi	TKO	5 (8)	29 Jul 1971	Genoa, Liguria, Italy	
8	Win	8–0	Abdel Ouni	TKO	3 (8)	23 Jun 1971	Rapallo, Liguria, Italy	
7	Win	7–0	Tony Oudina	KO	2 (8)	8 Jun 1971	Chiavari, Liguria, Italy	
6	Win	6–0	Jože Maver	TKO	4 (6)	4 May 1971	Sestri Levante, Liguria, Italy	
5	Win	5–0	Jimmy Joliveau	TKO	2 (6)	6 Apr 1971	Chiavari, Liguria, Italy	
4	Win	4–0	Stephan Kohler	TKO	2 (6)	17 Feb 1971	Porto Santo Stefano, Tuscany, Italy	
3	Win	3–0	Vlado Blažetić	KO	5 (6)	15 Dec 1970	Chiavari, Liguria, Italy	
2	Win	2–0	Carlo De Carli	TKO	2 (6)	28 Sep 1970	Bologna, Emilia-Romagna, Italy	
1	Win	1–0	Yves Fenollar	DQ	4 (6)	18 Jul 1970	Chiavari, Liguria, Italy	
