= Richard Caramanolis =

French boxer

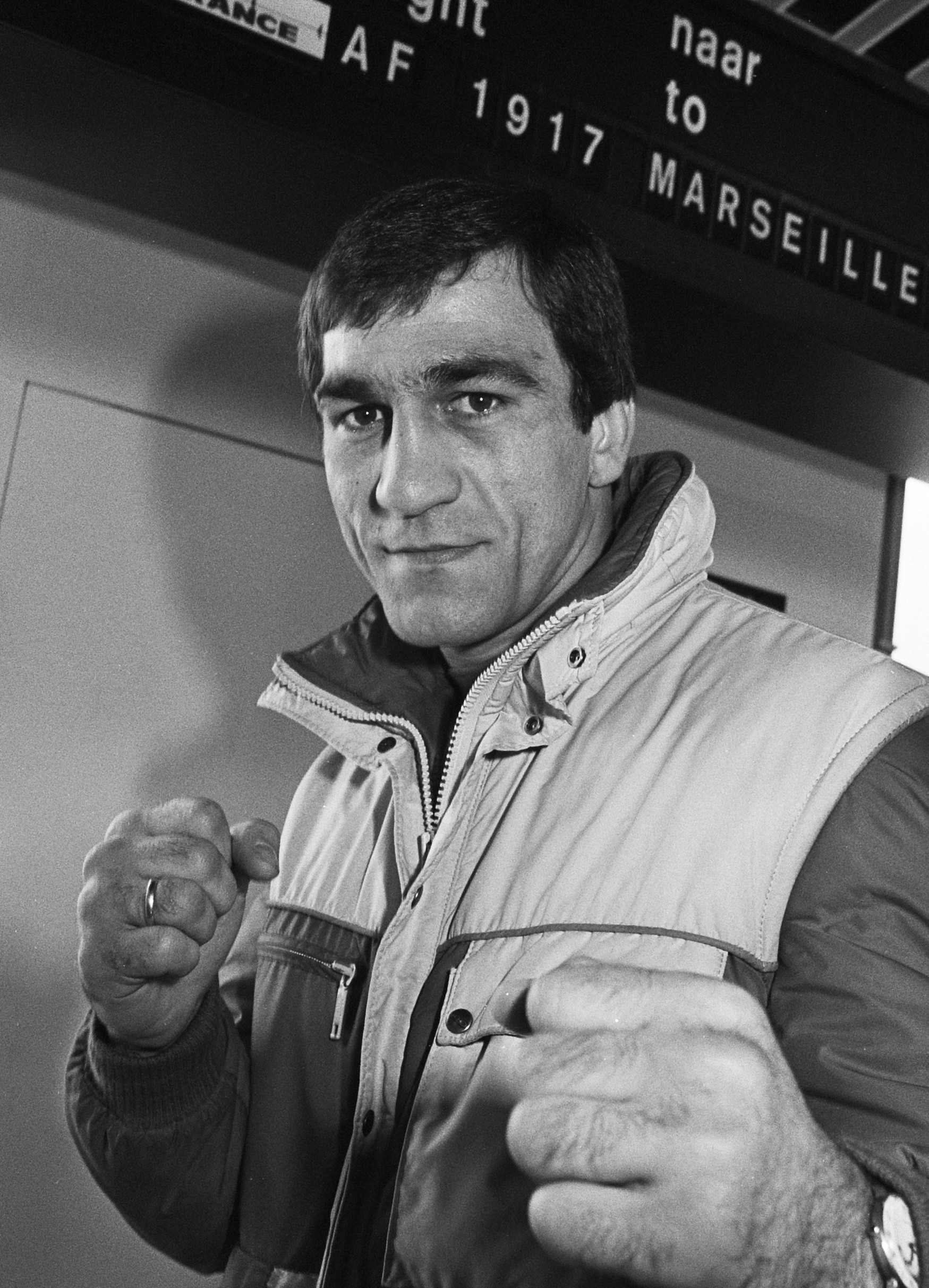
- Richard Caramanolis in 1984

Personal information
- Nationality: France
- Born: 7 March 1958 (age 68) Marseille, France
- Height: 1.85 m (6 ft 1 in)
- Weight: Light heavyweight

Boxing career

Boxing record
- Total fights: 45
- Wins: 39
- Win by KO: 27
- Losses: 4
- Draws: 2

Richard Caramanolis (born 7 March 1958) is a retired French professional boxer who was active between 1980 and 1989. On 2 February 1984 he won the European light heavyweight title (EBU) against Rudy Koopmans, extending his winning streak to 27–0. Three months later he lost the title to Alex Blanchard. In 1988 he fought the IBF world light heavyweight title, but lost to Charles Williams.
