= Nestor Hipolito Giovannini =

Argentinian boxer

Néstor Hipólito Giovannini
Personal information
- Nickname: Tito
- Born: February 7, 1961 (age 65) Rafaela, Santa Fe, Argentina
- Height: 6 ft 0 in (183 cm)
- Weight: Light heavyweight; Cruiserweight

Boxing career
- Stance: Orthodox

Boxing record
- Total fights: 52
- Wins: 38
- Win by KO: 16
- Losses: 10
- Draws: 4

Néstor Hipólito Giovannini (born February 7, 1961) is an Argentine former professional boxer. He held the WBO cruiserweight title from 1993 through 1994 and also contested for the WBC light-heavyweight title.

== Professional career ==
Giovannini made his professional boxing debut at the age of 23 in 1984 losing in a decision. He conquered the Argentinean light-heavyweight title in his 17th fight and a regional WBC title in his 29th fight which he would defend once. He continued campaigning at the light-heavyweight division until 1990, that year, he lost by TKO against Jeff Harding for the WBC light-heavyweight world title.

He then moved up to fight at cruiserweight where he got the chance to fight Markus Bott for the WBO cruiserweight world title, which he won by split decision in Hamburg, Germany. He would defend the title once, in a rematch with Bott by unanimous decision. In December 1994, he fought against Dariusz Michalczewski, losing by KO in the 10th round and dropping his WBO title. He would continue fighting scarcely until 2000 without much success.

== Professional boxing record ==
36 fights	31 wins	4 losses
By knockout	21	3
By decision	9	1
By disqualification	1	0
No contests	1	

No.	Result	Record	Opponent	Type	Round, time	Date	Location	Notes
52	Loss	38–10–4	Ezra Sellers	TKO	1 (10)	2000-01-29	Bally's Park Place, Atlantic City, New Jersey, U.S.	
51	Win	38–9–4	Luis Nelson González	RTD	4 (10)	1999-09-10	Club Atletico Central Argentino, Río Cuarto, Argentina	
50	Loss	37–9–4	Darío Walter Matteoni	PTS	12 (12)	1997-02-15	Mar del Plata, Argentina	For vacant Argentine cruiserweight title
49	Draw	37–8–4	Sergio Daniel Merani	PTS	12 (12)	1996-10-05	Estadio F.A.B., Buenos Aires, Argentina	For vacant Argentine cruiserweight title
48	Win	37–8–3	Luis Delmiro Alves	UD	10 (10)	1995-04-15	Buenos Aires, Argentina	
47	Loss	36–8–3	Dariusz Michalczewski	KO	10 (12)	1994-12-17	Alsterdorfer Sporthalle, Hamburg, Germany	Lost WBO cruiserweight title
46	Win	36–7–3	Larry Carlisle	TKO	6 (12)	1994-10-02	Buenos Aires, Argentina	
45	Win	35–7–3	José Arnaldo Balbuena	KO	6 (10)	1994-09-02	Venado Tuerto, Argentina	
44	Win	34–7–3	Miguel Ángel Antonio Aguirre	PTS	10 (10)	1994-05-06	Rafaela, Argentina	
43	Win	33–7–3	Eduardo Luiz Dos Santos	KO	5 (10)	1994-04-07	Sunchales, Argentina	
42	Win	32–7–3	Markus Bott	UD	12 (12)	1993-11-20	Alsterdorfer Sporthalle, Hamburg, Germany	Retained WBO cruiserweight title
41	Win	31–7–3	Markus Bott	SD	12 (12)	1993-06-26	Alsterdorfer Sporthalle, Hamburg, Germany	Won WBO cruiserweight title
40	Win	30–7–3	Andres Anselmi	TKO	1 (8)	1993-03-27	Los Sarmiento, Argentina	
39	Loss	29–7–3	Marcelo Domínguez	DQ	4 (12)	1993-02-20	Estadio F.A.B., Buenos Aires, Argentina	For vacant Argentine cruiserweight title
38	Win	29–6–3	Oscar Alfredo Gonzalez	KO	5 (10)	1991-11-22	Freyre, Argentina	
37	Draw	28–6–3	Miguel Angel Robledo	PTS	12 (12)	1991-08-09	Rafaela, Argentina	
36	Loss	28–6–2	Jorge Juan Salgado	PTS	12 (12)	1990-05-10	Villa Insuperable, Argentina	For vacant Argentine light-heavyweight title
35	Loss	28–5–2	Jeff Harding	TKO	11 (12)	1990-03-18	Resorts Casino Hotel, Atlantic City, New Jersey, U.S.	For WBC light-heavyweight title
34	Win	28–4–2	Victor Robledo	RTD	2 (10)	1989-12-02	Estadio Luna Park, Buenos Aires, Argentina	
33	Loss	27–4–2	Jeff Harding	UD	10 (10)	1989-05-10	Basketball Stadium, Newcastle, Australia	
32	Win	27–3–2	Victor Robledo	PTS	10 (10)	1989-03-17	Rafaela, Argentina	
31	Win	26–3–2	Mabobo Kamunga	PTS	8 (8)	1988-11-29	San Pellegrino Terme, Italy	
30	Win	25–3–2	Mwehu Beya	MD	12 (12)	1988-09-14	Scheggia, Italy	Retained WBC International light-heavyweight title
29	Win	24–3–2	Noè Cruciani	KO	1 (12)	1988-03-30	Spoleto, Italy	Won WBC International light-heavyweight title
28	Loss	23–3–2	Jorge Juan Salgado	PTS	12 (12)	1987-12-12	Ushuaia, Argentina	Lost Argentine light-heavyweight title
27	Win	23–2–2	Eduardo Domingo Contreras	PTS	10 (10)	1987-11-13	Rosario, Argentina	
26	Win	22–2–2	Nestor Albarracin	KO	4 (10)	1987-10-09	Ceres, Argentina	
25	Win	21–2–2	Angel Antonio Caro	TKO	3 (10)	1987-09-25	Resistencia, Argentina	
24	Win	20–2–2	Angel Antonio Caro	PTS	10 (10)	1987-08-21	Rafaela, Argentina	
23	Win	19–2–2	Miguel Angel Maldonado	RTD	7 (10)	1987-07-17	Tandil, Argentina	
22	Win	18–2–2	Miguel Angel Steimbach	PTS	10 (10)	1987-06-09	Rafaela, Argentina	
21	Win	17–2–2	Eduardo Domingo Contreras	PTS	12 (12)	1987-03-13	Rafaela, Argentina	Retained Argentine light-heavyweight title
20	Win	16–2–2	Clarismundo Aparecido Silva	PTS	10 (10)	1987-02-06	Rafaela, Argentina	
19	Draw	15–2–2	Jorge Juan Salgado	PTS	12 (12)	1986-12-12	Rafaela, Argentina	For South American light-heavyweight title
18	Win	15–2–1	Anibal Adan Romero	PTS	10 (10)	1986-11-13	Rafaela, Argentina	
17	Win	14–2–1	Jorge Juan Salgado	TKO	11 (12)	1986-08-23	Estadio Luna Park, Buenos Aires, Argentina	Won Argentine light-heavyweight title
16	Win	13–2–1	Pedro Ferraro	KO	8 (10)	1986-07-04	Rafaela, Argentina	
15	Win	12–2–1	Miguel Cea	RTD	7 (10)	1986-04-11	Rafaela, Argentina	
14	Win	11–2–1	Juan Carlos Fernandez	PTS	12 (12)	1985-12-20	Rafaela, Argentina	
13	Win	10–2–1	Juan Carlos Rodriguez	PTS	10 (10)	1985-11-21	Rafaela, Argentina	
12	Draw	9–2–1	Sergio Daniel Merani	PTS	8 (8)	1985-10-05	Estadio Luna Park, Buenos Aires, Argentina	
11	Win	9–2	Victor Robledo	PTS	10 (10)	1985-09-13	Rafaela, Argentina	
10	Win	8–2	Anibal Adan Romero	PTS	10 (10)	1985-08-23	San Vicente, Argentina	
9	Win	7–2	Juan Jose Leiva	RTD	7 (10)	1985-07-25	Rafaela, Argentina	
8	Loss	6–2	Mario Oscar Melo	TKO	5 (10)	1985-05-18	Estadio Luna Park, Buenos Aires, Argentina	
7	Win	6–1	Anibal Adan Romero	UD	10 (10)	1985-04-11	Rafaela, Argentina	
6	Win	5–1	Daniel Eduardo Guibaudo	KO	5 (10)	1985-03-22	Rafaela, Argentina	
5	Win	4–1	Miguel Antonio Mosna	PTS	8 (8)	1984-12-08	Estadio Luna Park, Buenos Aires, Argentina	
4	Win	3–1	Mario Oscar Melo	PTS	6 (6)	1984-11-03	Estadio Luna Park, Buenos Aires, Argentina	
3	Win	2–1	Anibal Adan Romero	PTS	6 (6)	1984-10-06	Estadio Luna Park, Buenos Aires, Argentina	
2	Win	1–1	Miguel Antonio Mosna	PTS	6 (6)	1984-08-25	Estadio Luna Park, Buenos Aires, Argentina	
1	Loss	0–1	Mario Oscar Melo	PTS	6 (6)	1984-07-06	Morteros, Argentina	

== See also ==
- List of world cruiserweight boxing champions

Sporting positions
Regional boxing titles
Preceded by Jorge Juan Salgado	Argentine light-heavyweight champion August 23, 1986 – December 12, 1987	Succeeded by Jorge Juan Salgado
Preceded by Noè Cruciani	WBC International light-heavyweight champion March 30, 1988 – 1990; Vacated	Vacant Title next held by Lottie Mwale
World boxing titles
Preceded by Markus Bott	WBO cruiserweight champion June 26, 1993 – December 17, 1994	Succeeded by Dariusz Michalczewski
