= Tom Collins (boxer) =

British boxer (born 1955)

Personal information
- Nickname: The Bomb
- Nationality: British
- Born: 1 July 1955 (age 71) Curaçao
- Height: 5 ft 11 in (1.80 m)
- Weight: Light heavyweight, cruiserweight

Boxing career

Boxing record
- Total fights: 50
- Wins: 26
- Win by KO: 19
- Losses: 22
- Draws: 2

Tom Collins (born 1 July 1955) is a British former boxer who held the British and European light heavyweight titles and fought for three world titles.

== Career ==
Born in Curaçao, Collins was based in Leeds. He began his professional career in 1977 and won his first six fights before suffering his first defeat in May 1978 to Harald Skog. In December 1978 and January 1979 he twice fought Dennis Andries who was at a similar stage in his career, Andries winning both fights. In February 1980 he won his first title, taking the BBBofC Central Area light heavyweight title with a first round stoppage of Greg Evans.

In March 1981 he beat Karl Canwell in an eliminator for Bunny Johnson's British title, and beat Andries on points a year later to take the title vacated by Johnson. He defended the title successfully in May 1982 against Trevor Cattouse, stopping the challenger in the fourth round. He made a second successful defence in March 1983 against Antonio Harris and a month later beat Alex Sua on points in an eliminator for the Commonwealth title. The third defence of his British title came in January 1984 against Andries, and Andries took the title on points. In a rematch three months later Andries won by the same result. When Andries vacated the title, Collins got a chance to regain it when he faced John Moody at the Royal Albert Hall in March 1987; Collins stopped Moody in the tenth round to become British champion for a second time.

In November 1987 he challenged for Alex Blanchard's EBU European title, winning via a second round stoppage to become European champion. Collins was due to fight Charles Williams for the IBF world light-heavyweight title in February 1988, but the fight was called off by promoter Frank Warren due to the IBF's insistence that it should be fought over 15 rounds, with the BBBofC refusing to sanction a fight of more than 12 rounds. The first defence of his European title came in May 1988 against Mark Kaylor. Collins knocked Kaylor out in the ninth round. Collins lost the European title in September when he was stopped in the seventh round by Pedro van Raamsdonk.

Having relinquished the British title, he won it for a third time in March 1989 with a second round stoppage of defending champion Tony Wilson.

In October 1989 Collins travelled to Australia to challenge Jeff Harding for the WBC world light-heavyweight title. After two rounds in which the fighters had traded heavy blows, Collins failed to come out for the third. Collins' $25,000 purse was initially withheld but was paid the following month.

In August 1990 Collins regained the European title with a ninth round knockout of Eric Nicoletta. He successfully defended the title in December 1990 against Christophe Girard, and in May 1991 fought Leeonzer Barber for the vacant WBO world light-heavyweight title; Collins retired at the start of the sixth round.

His next four fights included three losses and one draw, but in August 1993 he challenged Johnny Nelson for the World Boxing Federation world cruiserweight title; Nelson stopped him in the first round. This was Collins' final professional fight.
