= Rudy Koopmans =

Dutch boxer (born 1948)

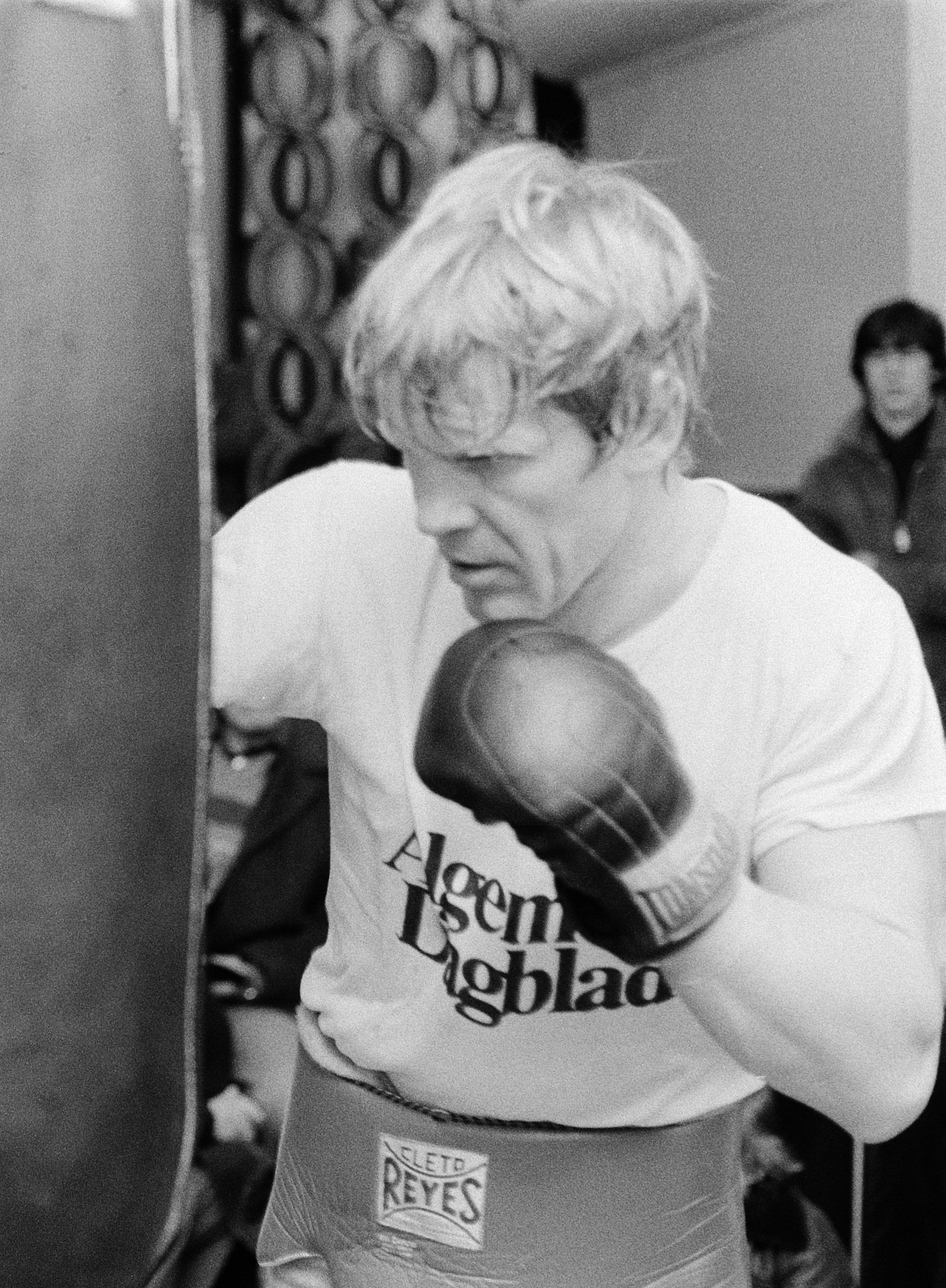
- Rudi Koopmans in 1979

Personal information
- Nationality: Netherlands
- Born: 30 January 1948 (age 78) Leeuwarden, Netherlands
- Height: 1.83 m (6 ft 0 in)
- Weight: Light heavyweight

Boxing career
- Reach: 2.11 m (6 ft 11 in)
- Stance: Orthodox

Boxing record
- Total fights: 47
- Wins: 43
- Win by KO: 30
- Losses: 2
- Draws: 2

Rudy Koopmans (also Rudi, born 30 January 1948) is a Dutch retired professional boxer who was active between 1972 and 1984. On 7 March 1979, he won the European light heavyweight title (EBU) against Aldo Traversaro in the seventh round. Over the following five years, he defended this title ten times, until losing it to Richard Caramanolis in February 1984. In 1980, he fought for the WBA title but lost to Eddie Mustafa Muhammad.

After retiring from boxing, Koopmans became a bodyguard and business partner of the underground businessman Bertus Lüske.

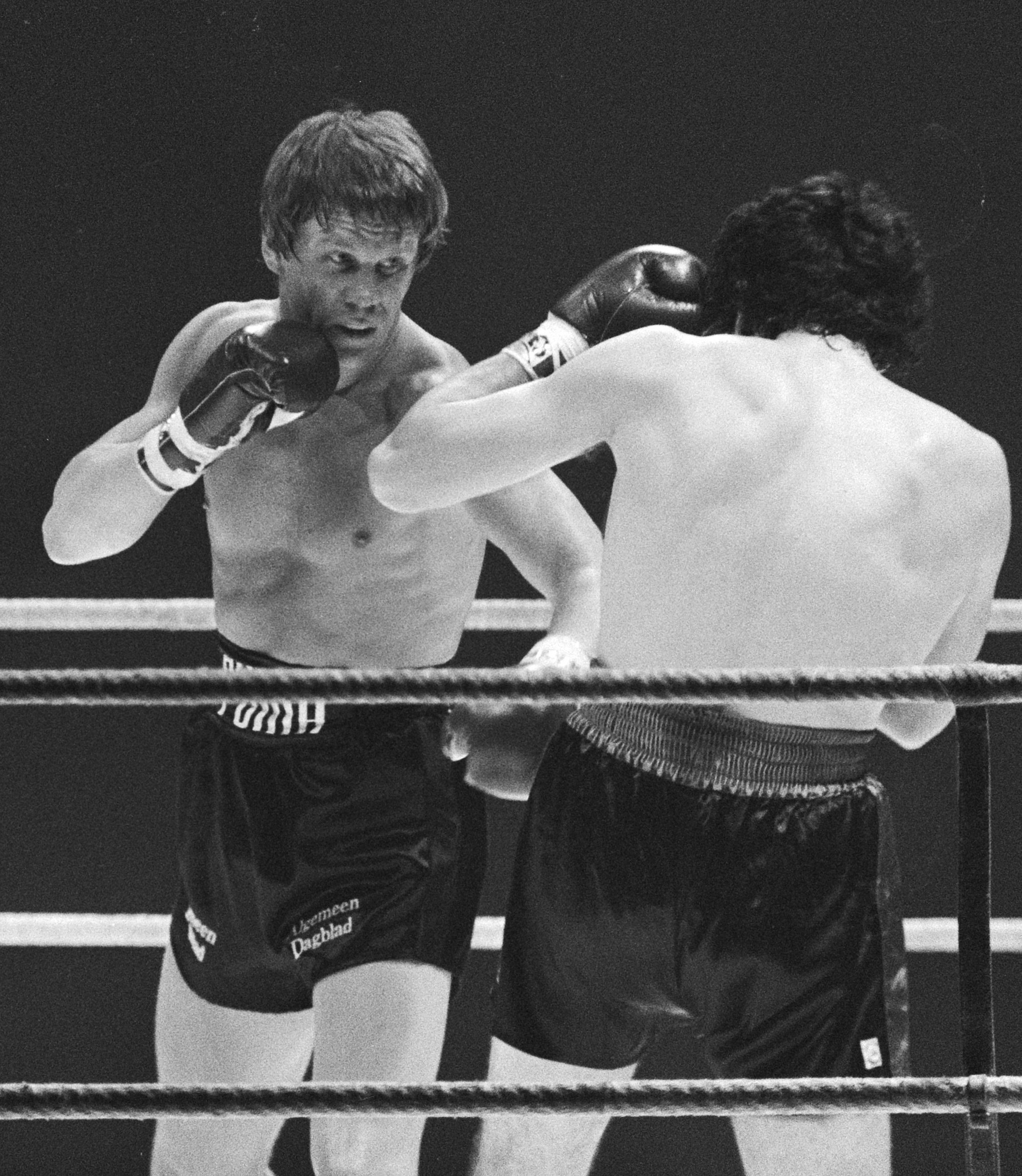
Rudi Koopmans vs Also Traversaro, 7 March 1979
