= Eisstadion an der Brehmstraße =

Indoor arena in Düsseldorf, Germany

- Eisstadion an der Brehmstraße
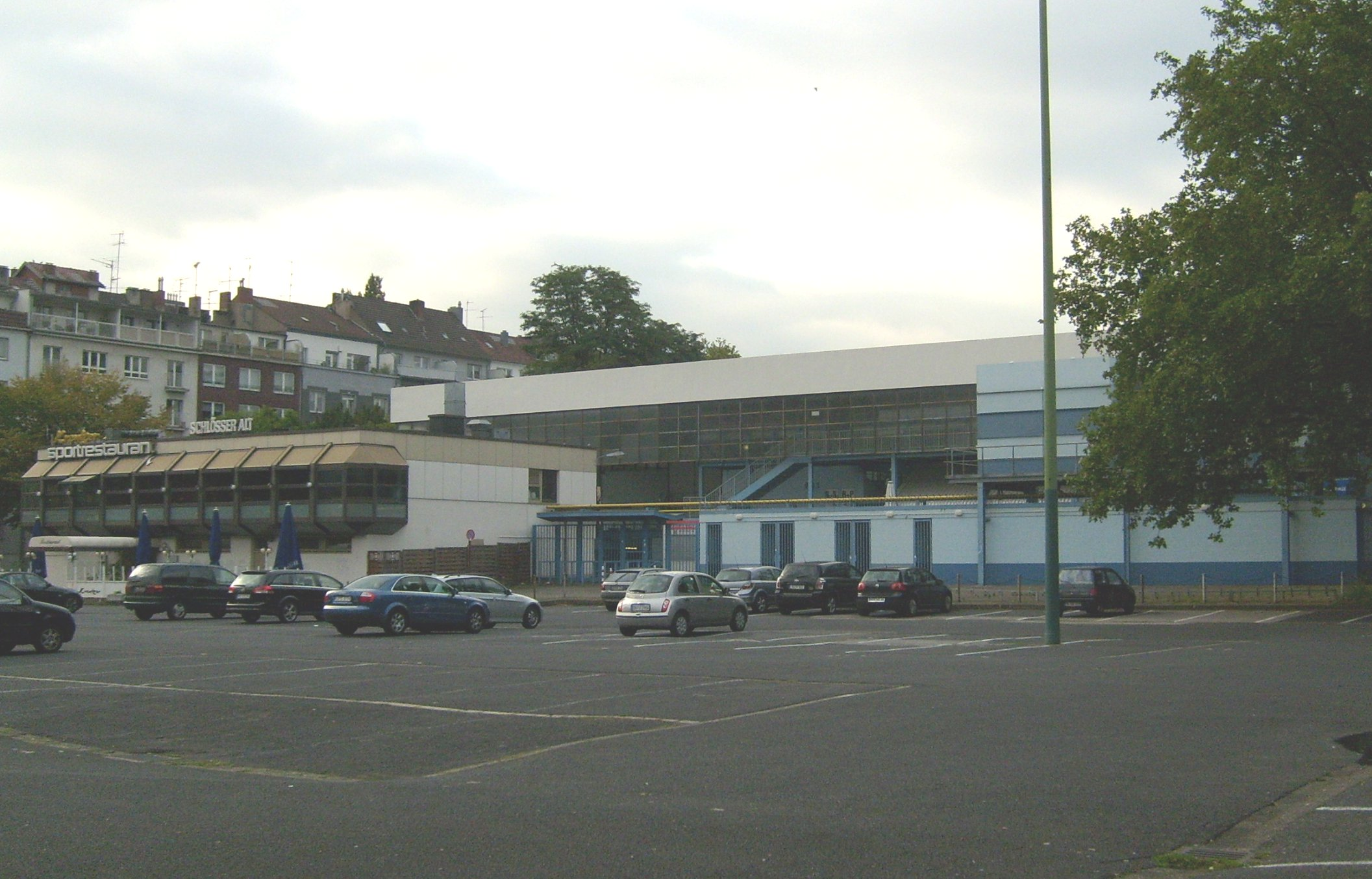
- The Eisstadion an der Brehmstraße
- Interactive map of Eisstadion an der Brehmstraße
- Coordinates: 51°14′30″N 6°48′10″E

Tenant
- Düsseldorfer EG (1935–2006)

Website
- Official website

Eisstadion an der Brehmstraße is an indoor arena in Düsseldorf, Germany which is primarily used for ice hockey and was the home arena of Düsseldorfer EG, until season 2006/2007. The arena opened in 1935 and holds 10,285 people. Three World Championships of ice hockey had taken place at the Brehmstraße in the 1950s, 1970s and 1980s. The DEG won 8 German championships in that stadium (1967, 1972, 1975, 1990, 1991, 1992, 1993, 1996).
