= Lüssow (Gützkow) =

- Ortsteil of Gützkow
- Interactive map of Lüssow
- Location within Germany Location within Mecklenburg-Vorpommern
- Coordinates: 53°55′N 13°30′E
- Country: Germany
- State: Mecklenburg-Vorpommern
- District: Vorpommern-Greifswald
- Town: Gützkow

Area
  - Total: 8.32 km^{2} (3.21 sq mi)
- Elevation: 19 m (62 ft)

Population (2006-12-31)
  - Total: 179
  - Density: 21.5/km^{2} (55.7/sq mi)
- Time zone: UTC+01:00 (CET)
  - Summer (DST): UTC+02:00 (CEST)
- Postal codes: 17506
- Dialling codes: 038353
- Vehicle registration: OVP

Lüssow is a village and a former municipality in the Vorpommern-Greifswald district, in Mecklenburg-Vorpommern, Germany. Since 1 January 2010, it is part of the town Gützkow.

== Notable residents ==
- Fritz Sdunek (1947–2014), boxing trainer
