= WTAN =

- Clearwater, Florida; United States
- Broadcast area: Pinellas County, Florida
- Frequency: 1340 kHz
- Branding: Tan Talk Radio Network

Programming
- Format: Talk radio; adult standards
- Affiliations: NBC News Radio; Music of Your Life; Tan Talk Radio Network

Ownership
- Owner: Wagenvoord Advertising Group Inc.
- Sister stations: WDCF

History
- First air date: 1948
- Call sign meaning: "Tan Talk Radio Network"

Technical information
- Licensing authority: FCC
- Facility ID: 17574
- Class: C
- Power: 1,000 watts
- Transmitter coordinates: 27°58′22.1″N 82°47′47.4″W
- Translator: 106.1 W291CW (Clearwater)
- Repeater: 1350 WDCF (Dade City)

Links
- Public license information: Public file; LMS
- Website: www.tantalk1340.com

WTAN (1340 AM) is a radio station broadcasting a mixed talk radio and adult standards format. Licensed to Clearwater, Florida, United States, the station is owned by Wagenvoord Advertising Group Inc.

WTAN relies heavily on brokered programming for its daily lineup. The Music of Your Life format airs when brokered programs are not airing.

WTAN is the flagship of the Tan Talk Radio Network, whose programming can also be heard on WDCF (1350 AM) in Dade City, Florida.
