= WDCF =

Simulcasts WTAN, Clearwater
- Dade City, Florida; United States
- Broadcast area: Eastern Pasco County, Florida
- Frequency: 1350 kHz

Programming
- Format: Talk radio; adult standards
- Affiliations: Tan Talk Radio Network

Ownership
- Owner: Wagenvoord Advertising Group, Inc.
- Sister stations: WTAN

History
- First air date: 1954
- Call sign meaning: "Wonderful Dade City, Florida"

Technical information
- Licensing authority: FCC
- Facility ID: 12294
- Class: B
- Power: 1,000 watts day; 500 watts night
- Transmitter coordinates: 28°20′5″N 82°11′22.3″W
- Translator: 102.3 W272EH (Dade City)

Links
- Public license information: Public file; LMS
- Website: www.tantalk1340.com

WDCF (1350 AM) is a radio station broadcasting a talk radio/adult standards format. Licensed to Dade City, Florida, United States, the station is currently owned by Wagenvoord Advertising Group, Inc.

WDCF is a part of the Tan Talk Radio Network, whose programming can also be heard on WTAN AM 1340 in Clearwater, Florida and translator station W272EH 102.3 FM Dade City.
