= Cypress Gardens, Florida =

- Census-designated place
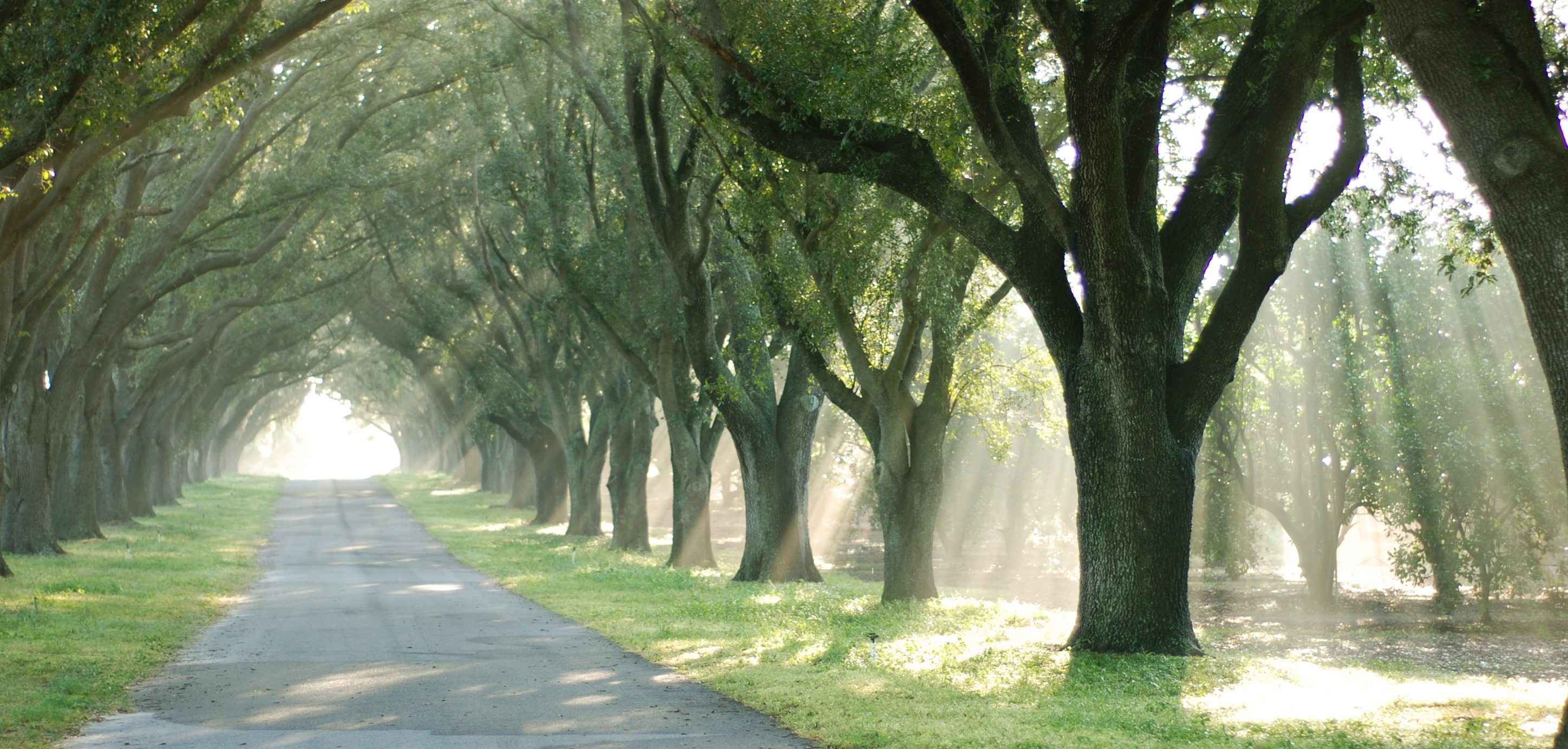
- An avenue of Quercus virginiana in Cypress Gardens

- Location in Polk County and the state of Florida
- Coordinates: 28°00′03″N 81°41′36″W
- Country: United States
- State: Florida
- County: Polk

Area
  - Total: 3.96 sq mi (10.25 km^{2})
  - Land: 3.45 sq mi (8.93 km^{2})
  - Water: 0.51 sq mi (1.32 km^{2})
- Elevation: 125 ft (38 m)

Population (2020)
  - Total: 10,169
  - Density: 2,947.7/sq mi (1,138.13/km^{2})
- Time zone: UTC-5 (Eastern (EST))
  - Summer (DST): UTC-4 (EDT)
- ZIP code: 33884
- Area code: 863
- FIPS code: 12-16050
- GNIS feature ID: 2402394

Cypress Gardens is a census-designated place (CDP) in Polk County, Florida, United States. The population was 10,169 at the 2020 census. It is part of the Lakeland–Winter Haven Metropolitan Statistical Area.

== Geography ==
According to the United States Census Bureau, the CDP has a total area of 4.3 square miles (11 km^{2}), of which 3.8 square miles (9.8 km^{2}) is land and 0.5 square miles (1.3 km^{2}) (11.42%) is water.

== Demographics ==
Historical population
Census	Pop.	Note	%±
1970	3,757		—
1980	8,043		114.1%
1990	9,188		14.2%
2000	8,844		−3.7%
2010	8,917		0.8%
2020	10,169		14.0%

=== 2020 census ===
As of the 2020 census, Cypress Gardens had a population of 10,169. The population density was 2,937.3 people per square mile. The median age was 45.1 years. 19.8% of residents were under the age of 18 and 22.8% of residents were 65 years of age or older. For every 100 females there were 92.8 males, and for every 100 females age 18 and over there were 90.0 males age 18 and over.

100.0% of residents lived in urban areas, while 0.0% lived in rural areas.

There were 4,131 households in Cypress Gardens, of which 26.7% had children under the age of 18 living in them. Of all households, 51.1% were married-couple households, 15.8% were households with a male householder and no spouse or partner present, and 26.5% were households with a female householder and no spouse or partner present. About 26.2% of all households were made up of individuals and 13.5% had someone living alone who was 65 years of age or older.

There were 4,525 housing units, of which 8.7% were vacant. The homeowner vacancy rate was 2.2% and the rental vacancy rate was 7.8%.

Racial composition as of the 2020 census
Race	Number	Percent
White	7,829	77.0%
Black or African American	648	6.4%
American Indian and Alaska Native	50	0.5%
Asian	275	2.7%
Native Hawaiian and Other Pacific Islander	7	0.1%
Some other race	411	4.0%
Two or more races	949	9.3%
Hispanic or Latino (of any race)	1,363	13.4%

=== 2000 census ===
At the 2000 census there were 8,844 people, 3,584 households, and 2,630 families in the CDP. The population density was 2,328.6 inhabitants per square mile (899.1/km^{2}). There were 3,942 housing units at an average density of 1,037.9 per square mile (400.7/km^{2}). The racial makeup of the CDP was 94.09% White, 1.92% African American, 0.28% Native American, 1.68% Asian, 0.86% from other races, and 1.16% from two or more races. Hispanic or Latino of any race were 3.10%.

Of the 3,584 households 27.3% had children under the age of 18 living with them, 63.2% were married couples living together, 8.0% had a female householder with no husband present, and 26.6% were non-families. 23.1% of households were one person and 12.6% were one person aged 65 or older. The average household size was 2.42 and the average family size was 2.84.

The age distribution was 21.5% under the age of 18, 5.0% from 18 to 24, 23.4% from 25 to 44, 26.8% from 45 to 64, and 23.4% 65 or older. The median age was 45 years. For every 100 females, there were 87.9 males. For every 100 females age 18 and over, there were 83.1 males.

The median household income was $49,778 and the median family income was $57,387. Males had a median income of $39,286 versus $26,595 for females. The per capita income for the CDP was $25,366. About 2.4% of families and 3.2% of the population were below the poverty line, including 3.6% of those under age 18 and 4.2% of those age 65 or over.
