= Boxing at the 1984 Summer Olympics – Middleweight =

Olympic boxing tournament

Middleweight boxing at the Games of the XXIII Olympiad
- Venue: Los Angeles Memorial Sports Arena
- Dates: 30 July – 11 August 1984
- Competitors: 27 from 27 nations

Medalists
| 1st place, gold medalist(s) | | Shin Joon-sup | South Korea |
| 2nd place, silver medalist(s) | | Virgil Hill | United States |
| 3rd place, bronze medalist(s) | | Aristides González | Puerto Rico |
| 3rd place, bronze medalist(s) | | Mohamed Zaoui | Algeria |

The men's middleweight event was part of the boxing programme at the 1984 Summer Olympics. The weight class allowed boxers of up to 75 kilograms to compete. The competition was held from 30 July to 11 August 1984. 27 boxers from 27 nations competed.

== Medalists ==
| Gold | Shin Joon-sup; South Korea |
| Silver | Virgil Hill; United States |
| Bronze | Aristides González; Puerto Rico |
| Bronze | Mohamed Zaoui; Algeria |

== Results ==
The following boxers took part in the event:

| Rank | Name | Country |
|---|---|---|
| 1 | Shin Joon-sup | South Korea |
| 2 | Virgil Hill | United States |
| 3T | Aristides González | Puerto Rico |
| 3T | Mohamed Zaoui | Algeria |
| 5T | Moses Mwaba | Zambia |
| 5T | Damir Škaro | Yugoslavia |
| 5T | Jerry Okorodudu | Nigeria |
| 5T | Pedro van Raamsdonk | Netherlands |
| 9T | Vincent Sarnelli | France |
| 9T | Tsiu Monne | Lesotho |
| 9T | Brian Schumacher | Great Britain |
| 9T | Hugo Corti | Argentina |
| 9T | Rick Duff | Canada |
| 9T | Tom Corr | Ireland |
| 9T | Noè Cruciani | Italy |
| 9T | Paulo Tuvale | Western Samoa |
| 17T | Edward Neblett | Barbados |
| 17T | Ahmed El-Gindy | Egypt |
| 17T | Andreas Bauer | West Germany |
| 17T | Brendon Cannon | Australia |
| 17T | Patrick Lihanda | Uganda |
| 17T | Pekka Laasanen | Finland |
| 17T | Arigoma Chiponda | Zimbabwe |
| 17T | Augustus Oga | Kenya |
| 17T | Paul Kamela | Cameroon |
| 17T | Chris Collins | Grenada |
| 17T | Otosico Havili | Tonga |

=== First round ===
- Virgil Hill (USA) def. Edward Neblett (BRB), RSC-2
- Damir Škaro (YUG) def. Ahmed El-Gindy (EGY), RSC-3
- Antonio Corti (ARG) def. Andreas Bauer (FRG), 5:0
- Rick Duff (CAN) def. Brendon Cannon (AUS), 5:0
- Shin Joon-Sup (KOR) def. Patrick Lihanda (UGA), 5:0
- Jeremiah Okorodudu (NGR) def. Pekka Lassanen (FIN), 5:0
- Tom Corr (IRL) def. Arigoma Mayero (ZIM), 5:0
- Pedro van Raamsdonk (HOL) def. Augustus Oga (KEN), 4:1
- Noe Cruciani (ITA) def. Paul Kamela (CMR), 5:0
- Paulo Tuvale (SAM) def. Chris Collins (GRN), RSC-1
- Aristides González (PUR) def. Otosico Havili (TNG), 4:1

=== Second round ===
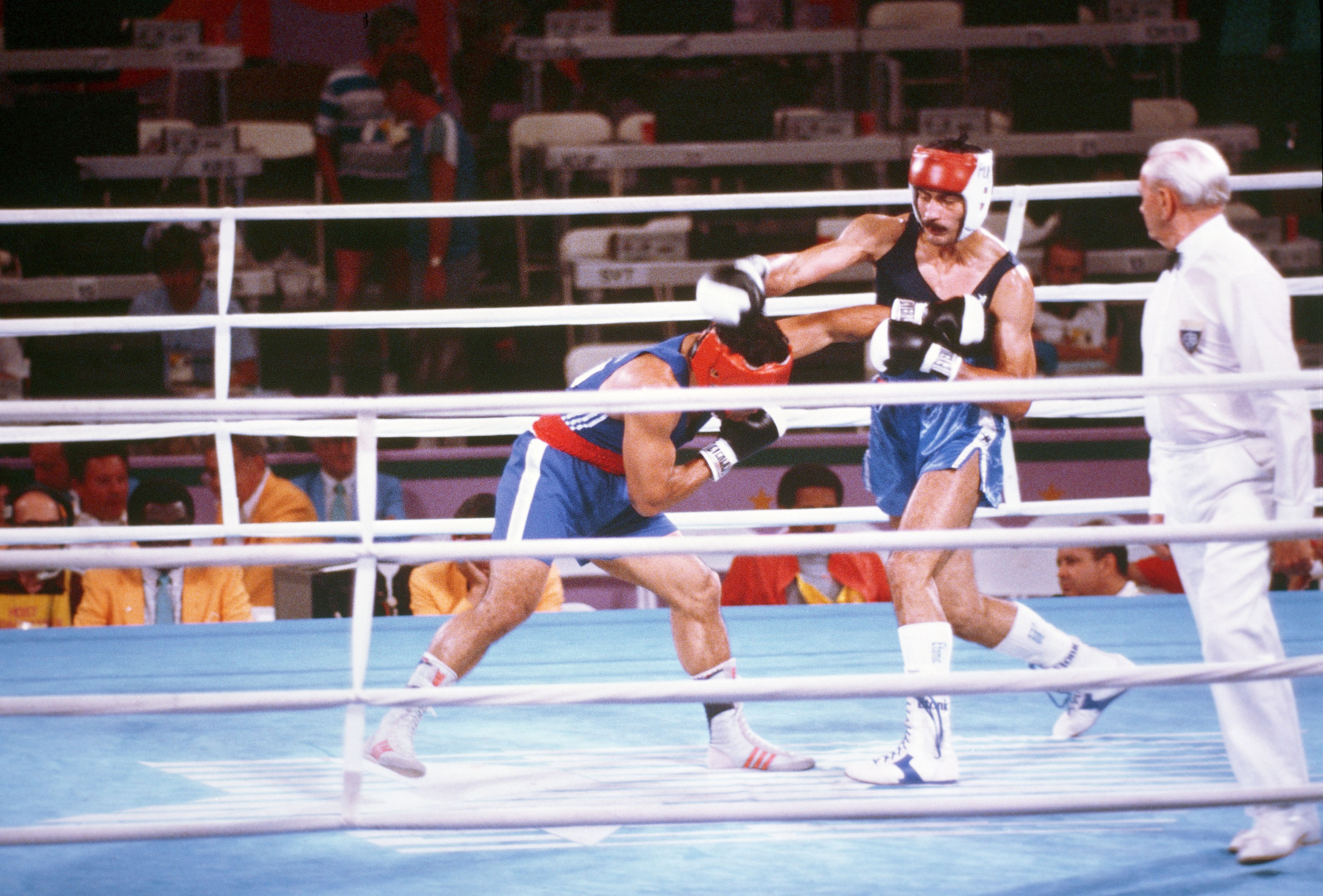
Puerto Rican Aristides González (right) defeats Western Samoan Paulo Tuvale

- Moses Mwaba (ZAM) def. Vincent Sarnelli (FRA), KO-1
- Mohamed Zaoui (ALG) def. Tsiu Monne (LES), RSC-2
- Virgil Hill (USA) def. Brian Schumacher (GBR), 5:0
- Damir Škaro (YUG) def. Antonio Corti (ARG), 4:1
- Shin Joon-Sup (KOR) def. Rick Duff (CAN), 4:1
- Jeremiah Okorodudu (NGR) def. Tom Corr (IRL), 4:1
- Pedro van Raamsdonk (HOL) def. Noe Cruciani (ITA), 5:0
- Aristides González (PUR) def. Paulo Tuvale (SAM), 5:0

=== Quarterfinals ===
- Mohamed Zaoui (ALG) def. Moses Mwaba (ZAM), 4:1
- Virgil Hill (USA) def. Damir Škaro (YUG), 4:1
- Shin Joon-Sup (KOR) def. Jeremiah Okorodudu (NGR), 4:1
- Aristides González (PUR) def. Pedro van Raamsdonk (HOL), 4:1

=== Semifinals ===
- Virgil Hill (USA) def. Mohamed Zaoui (ALG), 5:0
- Shin Joon-Sup (KOR) def. Aristides González (PUR), 4:1

=== Final ===
- Shin Joon-Sup (KOR) def. Virgil Hill (USA), 3:2
