= Boxing at the 1984 Summer Olympics – Light heavyweight =

Olympic boxing tournament

Light heavyweight boxing at the Games of the XXIII Olympiad
- Venue: Los Angeles Memorial Sports Arena
- Dates: 30 July – 11 August 1984
- Competitors: 24 from 24 nations

Medalists
1st place, gold medalist(s)		Anton Josipović	Yugoslavia
2nd place, silver medalist(s)		Kevin Barry	New Zealand
3rd place, bronze medalist(s)		Evander Holyfield	United States
3rd place, bronze medalist(s)		Mustapha Moussa	Algeria

The men's light heavyweight event was part of the boxing programme at the 1984 Summer Olympics. The weight class allowed boxers of up to 81 kilograms to compete. The competition was held from 30 July to 11 August 1984. 24 boxers from 24 nations competed.

== Schedule ==
All times are PDT (UTC−8).

Date	Time	Round
Tuesday, 31 July 1984		Round of 32
Saturday, 4 August 1984		Round of 16
Tuesday, 7 August 1984		Quarter-finals
Thursday, 9 August 1984		Semi-finals
Saturday, 11 August 1984		Final

== Medalists ==
Gold	Anton Josipović; Yugoslavia
Silver	Kevin Barry; New Zealand
Bronze	Evander Holyfield; United States
Bronze	Mustapha Moussa; Algeria

== Results ==
The following boxers took part in the event:

Rank	Name	Country
1	Anton Josipović	Yugoslavia
2	Kevin Barry	New Zealand
3T	Evander Holyfield	United States
3T	Mustapha Moussa	Algeria
5T	Tony Wilson	Great Britain
5T	Georgică Donici	Romania
5T	Sylvanus Okello	Kenya
5T	Jean-Paul Nanga-Ntsah	Cameroon
9T	Drake Thadzi	Malawi
9T	Roberto Oviedo	Argentina
9T	Fine Sani	Tonga
9T	Markus Bott	West Germany
9T	Michael Nassoro	Tanzania
9T	Ismail Salman	Iraq
9T	Christer Corpi	Sweden
9T	Jonathan Kiriisa	Uganda
17T	Juha Hänninen	Finland
17T	Ahmed El-Nagar	Egypt
17T	Taju Akay	Ghana
17T	Anthony Longdon	Grenada
17T	Philip Pinder	Bahamas
17T	Arcadio Fuentes	Puerto Rico
17T	Don Smith	Trinidad and Tobago
17T	Djiguible Traoré	Mali

=== First round ===
- Michael Nassoro (TNZ) def. Juha Hanninen (FIN), RSCH-1
- Syivaus Okello (KEN) def. Ahmed El-Naggar (EGY), RSC-3
- Evander Holyfield (USA) def. Taju Akay (GHA), RSC-3
- Ismail Salman (IRQ) def. Anthony Longdon (GRN), KO-2
- Jean-Paul Nanga (CMR) def. Philip Pinder (BAH), 5:0
- Christer Corpi (SWE) def. Arcadio Fuentes (PUR), KO-1
- Kevin Barry (NZL) def. Don Smith (TRI), 5:0
- Jonathan Kiriisa (UGA) def. Djiguble Traoré (MLI), 5:0

=== Second round ===
- Mustapha Moussa (ALG) def. Drake Thadzi (MLW), 5:0
- Anthony Wilson (GBR) def. Roberto Oviedo (ARG), RSC-1
- Georgica Donici (ROU) def. Fine Sani (TNG), 5:0
- Anton Josipović (YUG) def. Markus Bott (FRG), 4:1
- Syivaus Okello (KEN) def. Michael Nassoro (TNZ), 5:0
- Evander Holyfield (USA) def. Ismail Salman (IRQ), RSC-2
- Jean-Paul Nanga (CMR) def. Christer Corpi (SWE), 4:1
- Kevin Barry (NZL) def. Jonathan Kiriisa (UGA), 3:2

=== Quarterfinals ===
- Mustapha Moussa (ALG) def. Anthony Wilson (GBR), 5:0
- Anton Josipović (YUG) def. Georgica Donici (ROU), 5:0
- Evander Holyfield (USA) def. Syivaus Okello (KEN), KO-1
- Kevin Barry (NZL) def. Jean-Paul Nanga (CMR), 4:1

=== Semifinals ===
- Anton Josipović (YUG) def. Mustapha Moussa (ALG), 5:0
- Kevin Barry (NZL) def. Evander Holyfield (USA), DSQ-2

Holyfield was controversially disqualified for punching Barry after what seemed to be a stop. However, on a replay it is seen that the referee stopped the bout after his punches.

=== Final ===
- Anton Josipović (YUG) def. Kevin Barry (NZL), walk-over

Under IABA health regulation Barry was not allowed to box for 28 days, so he scratched from the final. During the medal ceremony, Josipović shared the highest step of the podium with Holyfield and raised his hand, thus acknowledging that Evander was the real winner.
