= Puerto Rico at the 1984 Summer Olympics =

- IOC code: PUR
- NOC: Puerto Rico Olympic Committee

in Los Angeles
- Competitors: 51 (43 men and 8 women) in 13 sports
- Flag bearer: Fernando J. Canales
- Medals Ranked 30th: Gold 0 Silver 1 Bronze 1 Total 2

Summer Olympics appearances (overview)
- 1948; 1952; 1956; 1960; 1964; 1968; 1972; 1976; 1980; 1984; 1988; 1992; 1996; 2000; 2004; 2008; 2012; 2016; 2020; 2024

Puerto Rico competed at the 1984 Summer Olympics in Los Angeles, United States. 51 competitors, 43 men and 8 women, took part in 45 events in 13 sports.

== Medalists ==
Medal	Name	Sport	Event	Date
Silver	Luis Ortiz	Boxing	Men's lightweight	11 August
Bronze	Arístides González	Boxing	Men's middleweight	9 August

== Archery ==
In the third time the nation competed in archery at the Olympics, Puerto Rico entered one man.

Men's Individual Competition

- Ismael Rivera — 2089 points (→ 58th place)

== Athletics ==
Men's 200 metres

- Luis Morales
- Nelson Erazo

Men's Marathon

- Jorge Gonzáles

- Final — 2:14:00 (→ 13th place)

- César Mercado

- Final — 2:19:09 (→ 31st place)

- Claudio Cabán

- Final — 2:27:16 (→ 53rd place)

Men's 3,000 m Steeplechase

- Carmelo Ríos

Men's Pole Vault

- Edgardo Rivera

- Qualifying Round — 5.10m (→ did not advance)

Women's 400 metres

- Marie Mathieu

Women's 800 metres

- Angelita Lind

Women's 4×400 metres Relay

- Margaret de Jesús
- Evelyn Mathieu
- Marie Mathieu
- Angelita Lind

Women's Marathon

- Naydi Nazario

- Final — 2:45:49 (→ 33rd place)

Women's High Jump

- Laura Agront

- Qualification — 1.80m (→ did not advance, 22nd place)

Women's Long Jump

- Madeline de Jesús

- Qualification — 5.63 m (→ did not advance, 21st place)

== Boxing ==
Men's Light Flyweight (– 48 kg)

- Rafael Ramos

- First Round — Defeated Carlos Salazar (Argentina), walk-over
- Second Round — Defeated Jesús Beltre (Dominican Republic), on points (4:1)
- Quarterfinals — Lost to Salvatore Todisco (Italy), on points (1:4)

Men's Flyweight (– 51 kg)

- José Rivera

Men's Bantamweight (– 54 kg)

- Juan Molina

- First Round — Bye
- Second Round — Defeated Jarmo Eskelinen (Finland), 5-0
- Third Round — Lost to Pedro Nolasco (Dominican Republic), 2-3

Men's Featherweight (– 57 kg)

- Orlando Fernández

Men's Lightweight (– 60 kg)

- Luis Ortíz - Won the silver medal

Men's Light-Welterweight (– 63.5 kg)

- Jorge Maysonet

Men's Welterweight (– 67 kg)

- Carlos Reyes

Men's Light-Middleweight (– 71 kg)

- Víctor Claudio

Men's Middleweight (– 75 kg)

- Arístides González → Bronze Medal

- First Round — Defeated Otosico Havili (Tonga), 4:1
- Second Round — Defeated Paulo Tuvale (Samoa), 5:0
- Quarterfinals — Defeated Pedro van Raamsdonk (Netherlands), 4:1
- Semifinals — Lost to Shin Joon-Sup (South Korea), 1:4

Men's Light-Heavyweight (– 81 kg)

- Arcadio Fuentes

Men's Super Heavyweight (+ 91 kg)

- Isaac Barrientos

- First Round — Lost to Tyrell Biggs (USA), 0:5

== Cycling ==
One cyclist represented Puerto Rico in 1984.

Individual road race

- Ramón Rivera — did not finish (→ no ranking)

== Fencing ==
Two male fencers represented Puerto Rico in 1984

Men's foil

- Edgardo Díaz

Men's épée

- Gilberto Peña

== Judo ==
Men's Half-Middleweight

- Jorge Bonnet

Men's Middleweight

- José Fuentes

== Swimming ==
Men's 100m Freestyle

- Fernando Cañales

- Heat — 51.75 (→ did not advance, 19th place)

- Antonio Portela

- Heat — 52.47 (→ did not advance, 27th place)

Men's 200m Freestyle

- Fernando Cañales

- Heat — 1:56.60 (→ did not advance, 37th place)

Men's 100m Butterfly

- Filiberto Colon

- Heat — 56.66 (→ did not advance, 28th place)

Men's 200m Butterfly

- Filiberto Colon

- Heat — 2:01.80
- B-Final — 2:01.27 (→ 12th place)

Men's 4 × 100 m Freestyle Relay

- Fernando Cañales, Miguel Figueroa, Antonio Portela, and Rafael Gandarillas

- Heat — 3:30.66 (→ did not advance, 14th place)

== Wrestling ==
Men's Bantamweight Freestyle

- Orlando Caceres

Men's Featherweight Freestyle

- Carmelo Flores

Men's Lightweight Freestyle

- José Betancourt

== See also ==
- Puerto Rico at the 1983 Pan American Games
- Sports in Puerto Rico
