= Shin Joon-sup =

South Korean boxer (born 1963)

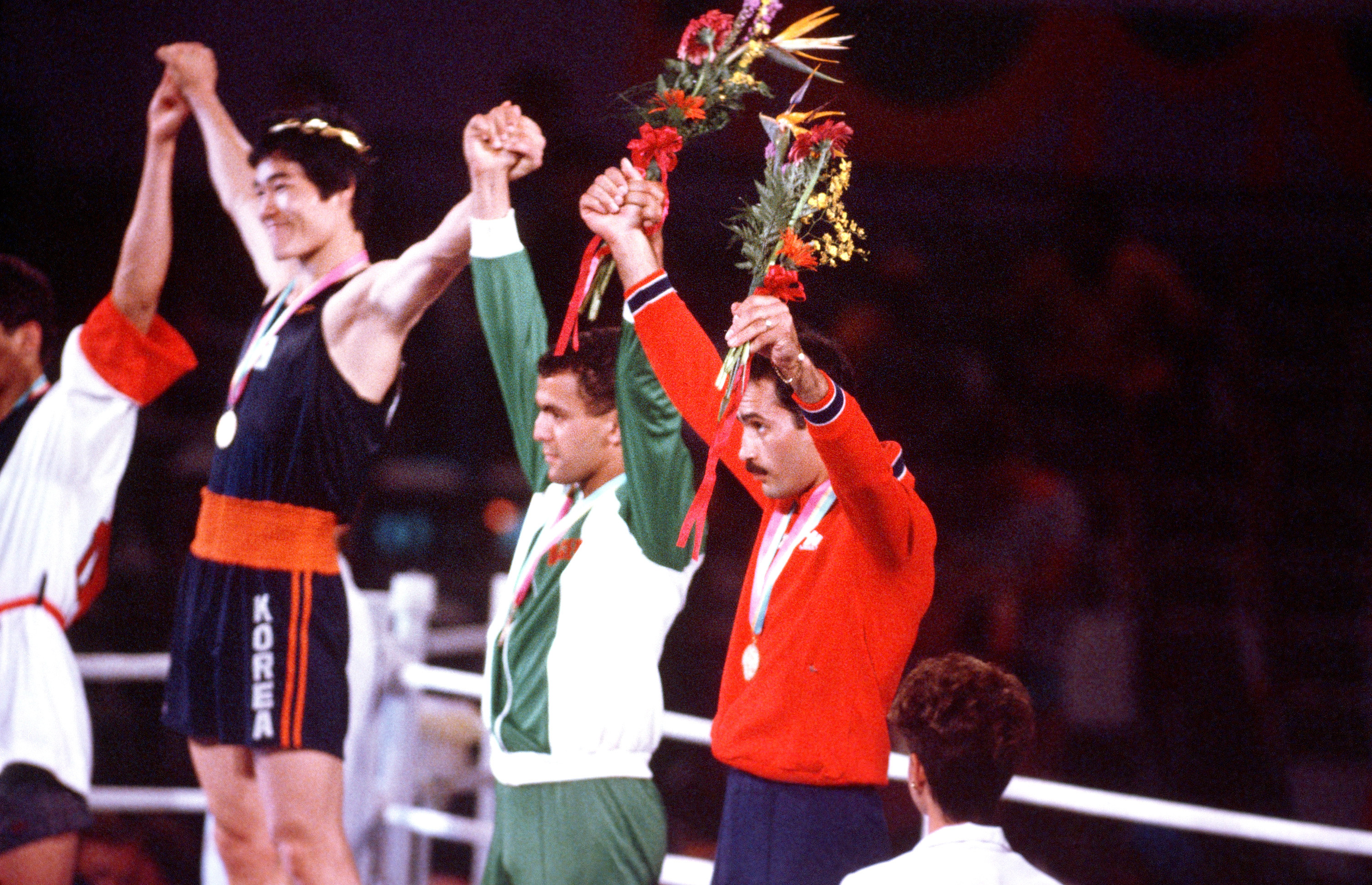
- Shin Joon-Sup on the 1984 Olympic podium

Medal record

Men's boxing

Representing South Korea

Olympic Games
Gold medal – first place	1984 Los Angeles	Middleweight

Asian Games
Gold medal – first place	1986 Seoul	Middleweight

World Cup
Gold medal – first place	1983 Rome	Middleweight

- Shin Joon-sup
- Hangul: 신준섭
- Hanja: 申俊燮
- RR: Sin Junseop
- MR: Sin Chunsŏp

Shin Joon-sup (Korean: 신준섭; born June 17, 1963, in Namwon, Jeollabuk-do, South Korea) is a former South Korean middleweight boxer and 1984 Olympic Gold Medalist.

== Career ==
Shin began boxing at the age of 16 in 1980 and became a member of the South Korea national boxing team in 1983, participating in the King's Cup Boxing where he won silver in middleweight.

Shin won the gold medal for South Korea in the middleweight division at the 1983 Boxing World Cup in Rome, Italy. In the quarterfinal bout, he beat 1976 Olympic silver medalist Pedro Gamarro by unanimous decision.

Next year, Shin won the Olympic gold medal at the 1984 Summer Olympics, beating 1984 National Golden Gloves champion Virgil Hill in the final.

After the Olympics, Shin announced his retirement from boxing in order to focus on his studies. However, he returned to the ring in 1985 to win an Asian Games gold medal next year.

At the 1986 Asian Games, Shin easily won the middleweight gold medal, dominating all the opponents in the tourney. He did not turn professional, and permanently retired from competitive boxing after the Asian Games.

== Post career ==
Shin earned a master's degree in physical education from Wonkwang University. In 1992, he was named an assistant coach of the South Korea national boxing team for the 1992 Summer Olympics. Shin served as a part-time professor at the college before immigrating to the United States in 1996.

He currently resides in Atlanta, Georgia, running his own business. Since 2018, he has been serving as a head coach of the boxing organization in Namwon.

== Results ==
1983 Boxing World Cup
Event	Round	Result	Opponent	Score
Middleweight	Quarterfinal	Win	(Venezuela) Pedro Gamarro	5-0
Middleweight	Semifinal	Win	(Socialist Federal Republic of Yugoslavia) Nusret Redzepi	5-0
Middleweight	Final	Win	(Italy) Noe Cruciani	4-1

1984 Summer Olympics
Event	Round	Result	Opponent	Score
Middleweight	First	Win	(Uganda) Patrick Lihanda	5-0
Middleweight	Second	Win	(Canada) Rick Duff	4-1
Middleweight	Quarterfinal	Win	(Nigeria) Jerry Okorodudu	4-1
Middleweight	Semifinal	Win	(Puerto Rico) Arístides González	4-1
Middleweight	Final	Win	(United States) Virgil Hill	3-2
