= Kevin Barry (boxer) =

New Zealand boxer (born 1959)

Personal information
- Born: Kevin Michael Joseph Barry; 10 October 1959 (age 66) Christchurch, New Zealand
- Occupations: Boxing manager and coach
- Years active: 1992–present
- Spouse: Tanya Moss
- Relatives: Kevin Barry Sr. (father); Taylor Barry (son)
- Website: www.teambarryboxing.com
Medal record
Representing New Zealand
Men's boxing
Olympic Games
Silver medal – second place	1984 Los Angeles	Light heavyweight
Commonwealth Games
Bronze medal – third place	1982 Brisbane	Light heavyweight

Kevin Michael Joseph Barry (born 10 October 1959) is a New Zealand former amateur boxer, boxing trainer, manager and occasional commentator. He is the son of noted boxing trainer Kevin Barry Sr.

== Amateur career ==
Kevin Barry's first international success was a bronze medal at the 1982 Brisbane Commonwealth Games in the Light Heavyweight division.

Barry was the first boxer in 56 years to win a medal at the Olympic Games for New Zealand.

=== Olympic results ===
- Defeated Don Smith (Trinidad and Tobago) 5–0
- Defeated Jonathan Kiriisa (Uganda) 3–2
- Defeated Jean-Paul Nanga (Cameroon) 4–1
- Defeated Evander Holyfield (United States) DQ 2
- Lost to Anton Josipović (Yugoslavia)

== Professional career ==
Barry became a professional coach in 1990. He remains active in boxing as a trainer and manager.

== Training career ==
Barry remained involved in boxing and became a trainer. After New Zealand Heavyweight David Tua won bronze at the 1992 Summer Olympics in Barcelona, Barry helped persuade him to turn professional, managing Tua from 1992 to 2003 and acting as his trainer from 2001 to 2003.

Under Barry's management Tua became a contender, unsuccessfully challenging heavyweight champion Lennox Lewis in 2000. In addition Barry has a number of up and coming boxers under his guidance. He also trains prominent businessmen, Las Vegas club owners, and Wall Street businessmen.

== Personal life ==
Barry is married to former New Zealand Olympic gymnast Tanya Moss. They have three children together (daughter Jordy and twin sons Taylor and Mitchell). They reside in Las Vegas, Nevada.

A frequent commentator on New Zealand boxing broadcasts and a prominent member of the New Zealand boxing community, Barry has been active in nearly all facets of boxing, from Olympic athlete to trainer, manager, promoter and television commentator.

== Notable boxers trained ==
- (New Zealand) Joseph Parker
- (Poland) Izu Ugonoh
- (Australia) Robbie Peden
- (New Zealand) David Tua
- (Kazakhstan) Beibut Shumenov
- (United States) Brian Minto
- (New Zealand) Shane Cameron
- (American Samoa) Maselino Masoe
