= Boxing at the 1980 Summer Olympics – Light heavyweight =

Boxing competitions

Light heavyweight boxing at the Games of the XXII Olympiad
- Venue: Olympiysky Sports Complex
- Date: 26 July – 2 August 1980
- Competitors: 15 from 15 nations

Medalists
1st place, gold medalist(s)		Slobodan Kačar	Yugoslavia
2nd place, silver medalist(s)		Paweł Skrzecz	Poland
3rd place, bronze medalist(s)		Herbert Bauch	East Germany
3rd place, bronze medalist(s)		Ricardo Rojas	Cuba

The light heavyweight boxing competition at the 1980 Olympic Games in Moscow was held from 26 July to 2 August at the Olympiysky Sports Complex. 19 boxers from 19 nations competed.

== Schedule ==
Date	Time	Round
Saturday, 26 July 1980	12:00; 18:00	Round of 16
Tuesday, 29 July 1980	19:00	Quarterfinals
Thursday, 31 July 1980	13:00	Semifinals
Saturday, 2 August 1980	15:00	Final

== Results ==
Round of 16
Bozhidar Ivanov (BUL)	0
Herbert Bauch (GDR)	5
Benny Pike (AUS)	RET
Anaclet Wamba (CGO)
Michael Nassoro (TAN)
Slobodan Kačar (YUG)	RET
David Kvachadze (URS)	RSC
Andy Straughn (GBR)
Paweł Skrzecz (POL)	WO
Mohamed Bouchiche (ALG)
Jean-Paul Nanga-Ntsah (CMR)
Georgică Donici (ROU)	RSC
Michael Madsen (DEN)	3
Csaba Kuzma (HUN)	2
Ismail Salman (IRQ)	0
Ricardo Rojas (CUB)	5

Quarterfinals
Herbert Bauch (GDR)	KO
Benny Pike (AUS)
Slobodan Kačar (YUG)	4
David Kvachadze (URS)	1
Paweł Skrzecz (POL)	4
Georgică Donici (ROU)	1
Michael Madsen (DEN)	1
Ricardo Rojas (CUB)	4

Semifinals
Herbert Bauch (GDR)
Slobodan Kačar (YUG)	RSC
Paweł Skrzecz (POL)	3
Ricardo Rojas (CUB)	2

Final
Slobodan Kačar (YUG)	4
Paweł Skrzecz (POL)	1
