= Barry Taylor =

Barry Taylor may refer to:

- Barry Taylor (Auf Wiedersehen, Pet), a fictional character on the British television drama Auf Wiedersehen, Pet
- Barry Taylor (Barnsley F.C.), English football fan
- Barry Taylor (footballer) (1939-1996), English footballer, see List of Oldham Athletic A.F.C. players (25–99 appearances)

== See also ==
- Taylor Barry (born 1995), New Zealand boxer
