= Jean Spencer (gymnast) =

New Zealand physicist and gymnast

Personal information
- Born: Jean Charlotte Spencer; 10 June 1940 (age 85) Woodford, Great Britain
- Height: 165 cm (5 ft 5 in)
- Weight: 60 kg (130 lb)

Sport
- Country: New Zealand
- Sport: Artistic gymnastics

Jean Charlotte Spencer (later Lang, born 10 June 1940) is a New Zealand Olympic gymnast. Born in the United Kingdom, she now lives in Australia.

== Private life ==
Spencer was born in 1940 in Woodford, now Greater London, Great Britain, but part of Essex at the time of her birth. She received her secondary education at Epsom Girls' Grammar School in Auckland, New Zealand, where she was dux. She attended Auckland University College and graduated Master of Science with Honours in physics in 1964. She later moved to Australia. In 2013, Lang and another Epsom Girls' Grammar School alumna established an annual prize for excellence in physics so that the recipients can enrol at a university to study physics or engineering.

== Gymnastics career ==
Spencer represented her country at the 1964 Summer Olympics in Tokyo, Japan, in gymnastics. In the vault, she came 76th. In the floor exercise, she was 81st. On the uneven bars, she came 75th. On the balance beam, she was 79th. In the Women's individual all-around, she was ranked 78th of 86 competitors. She is listed as New Zealand Olympic competitor number 200. It would be 20 years—1984— before the next New Zealand gymnast, Tanya Moss, would represent the country at another Summer Olympics.

Lang was later on the national committee of the Australian Gymnastic Federation. She was the co-ordinator for elite gymnasts in New South Wales for the NSW Gymnastic Association and a judge at gymnastics competitions. She was made a life member of Gymnastics New South Wales in 2010.
