= Vincent Sarnelli =

French boxer

Personal information
- Nationality: French
- Born: February 24, 1962; Villefranche-sur-Saône, France
- Died: February 6, 1986 (aged 23); Pierre-Bénite, France

Sport
- Sport: Boxing

Vincent Sarnelli (24 February 1962 – 6 February 1986) was a French boxer. He competed in the men's middleweight event at the 1984 Summer Olympics. At the 1984 Summer Olympics, he lost to Moses Mwaba of Zambia. He became a professional boxer in 1985 and he died of blood cancer on 6 February 1986.
