= Brendon Cannon =

Australian boxer

Personal information
- Nationality: Australian
- Born: 30 August 1961 (age 63)

Sport
- Sport: Boxing

Brendon Cannon (born 30 August 1961) is an Australian boxer. He competed in the men's middleweight event at the 1984 Summer Olympics. At the 1984 Summer Olympics, he lost to Rick Duff of Canada.
