= Bozhidar Ivanov =

Bozhidar Ivanov can refer to:

- Bozhidar Ivanov (boxer) (born 1956), a Bulgarian Olympic boxer
- Bozhidar Ivanov (gymnast) (born 1943), a Bulgarian Olympic gymnast
