= Paweł Skrzecz =

Polish boxer (born 1957)

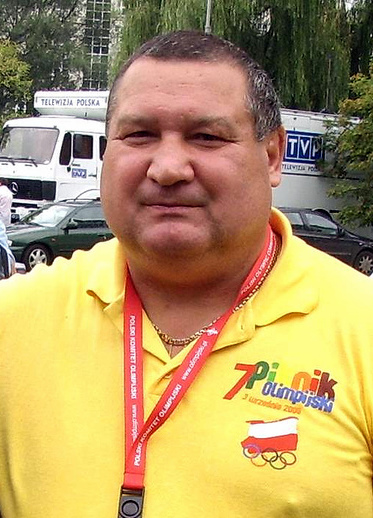

Medal record

Men's Boxing

Representing Poland

Olympic Games
Silver medal – second place	1980 Moscow	Light Heavyweight

World Cup
Bronze medal – third place	1983 Rome	Light Heavyweight

World Amateur Championships
Silver medal – second place	Munich 1982	Light Heavyweight

European Amateur Championships
Bronze medal – third place	1979 Cologne	Light Heavyweight
Silver medal – second place	1983 Varna	Light Heavyweight

Paweł Ludwik Skrzecz (born 25 August 1957 in Warsaw) is a retired boxer from Poland, who won the silver medal in the light heavyweight division (– 81 kg) at the 1980 Summer Olympics in Moscow, Soviet Union. In the final he was beaten by Slobodan Kačar of Yugoslavia. Two years later he won the silver medal at the World Championships in Munich, West Germany.

== Olympic results ==
Below are the results of Pawel Skrzecz, a Polish light heavyweight boxer who competed at the 1980 Moscow Olympics:

- Round of 16: Defeated Mohamed Bouchiche (Algeria) by walkover
- Quarterfinal: Defeated Georgica Donici (Romania) by majority decision, 4–1
- Semifinal: Defeated Ricardo Rojas (Cuba) by split decision, 3–2
- Final: Lost to Slobodan Kačar (Yugoslavia) by majority decision, 1–4 (was awarded silver medal)
