= Tuvale =

Tuvale is a surname. Notable people with the surname include:

- Paulo Tuvale (born 1954), Samoan boxer
- Teo Tuvale (1855–1919), Samoan historian
