= Mustapha Moussa =

Algerian boxer (1962–2024)

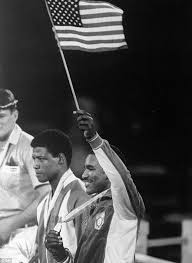
- Moussa with Evander Holyfield, bronze medalists in the 1984 Olympic Games

Personal information
- Nationality: Algerian
- Born: Mustapha Moussa; 2 February 1962 Mascara, French Algeria
- Died: 3 August 2024 (aged 62) Oran, Algeria
- Weight: Light Heavyweight

Boxing career
Medal record
Men's amateur boxing
Representing Algeria
Olympic Games
Bronze medal – third place	1984 Los Angeles	L. heavyweight
African Games
Silver medal – second place	1987 Nairobi	L. heavyweight
Mediterranean Games
Gold medal – first place	1983 Casablanca	L. heavyweight
Pan Arab Games
Gold medal – first place	1985 Rabat	L. heavyweight

Mustapha Moussa (Arabic: مصطفى موسى; 2 February 1962 – 3 August 2024) was an Algerian boxer who fought in the light heavyweight division. He won the first-ever Olympic medal for Algeria, winning a bronze at the 1984 Summer Olympics in Los Angeles. He shared the podium with American boxer Evander Holyfield.

On 3 August 2024, Moussa died in Oran from injuries sustained in a traffic collision. He was 62.

== Career ==
Moussa was born in Mascara but he grew up in Oran. He started boxing with ASM Oran and moved after to MC Oran.

=== Pro career ===
Moussa turned pro in 1988 and had little success. He lost his pro debut to future titlist Mauro Galvano, as well as his other fight in 1988. He fought once in 1992 and 2004, losing both fights. His career record is 0–4–0.

== Olympic results ==
- 1st round bye
- Defeated Drake Thadzi (Malawi) 5–0
- Defeated Tony Wilson (Great Britain) 5–0
- Lost to Anton Josipović (Yugoslavia) 0–5

=== Career ===
- (bronze) Olympic Games 1984 Los Angeles, USA (81 kg )
- (gold) CISM Championships - Algiers, Algeria 1982 (81 kg )
- (gold) Mediterranean Games Casablanca, Morocco 1983 (81 kg )
- (gold) Pan Arab Games Rabat, Morocco 1985 (81 kg )
- (silver) All-Africa Games ( Nairobi, Kenya) 1987 (- 81 kg )
- Quarter-finals World Cup - Seoul, South Korea 1985 (- 81 kg )

=== Tournament ===
- (silver) President's Cup ( Jakarta, Indonesia ) 1981 (75 kg)
- (silver) French Open ( Périgueux, France ) 1981 (81 kg )
- (bronze) Feliks Stamm Memorial ( Warsaw, Poland) 1983 (81 kg )
- (bronze) Giraldo Cordova Cardin Tournament - Santiago de Cuba 1983 (81 kg )
- (gold) 24 Fevrier Tournament (Algiers, Algeria) 1985 (81 kg )
