= Slobodan Kačar =

Bosnia and Herzegovina boxer (born 1957)

Personal information
- Nationality: (Socialist Federal Republic of Yugoslavia) Yugoslav-Serbian
- Born: Slobodan Kačar; 15 September 1957 (age 68) Jajce, SR Bosnia and Herzegovina, SFR Yugoslavia
- Height: 6 ft 0 1/2 in (184 cm)
- Weight: Light heavyweight

Boxing career
- Reach: 74 in (188 cm)
- Stance: Orthodox

Boxing record
- Total fights: 24
- Wins: 22
- Win by KO: 12
- Losses: 2
Medal record
Representing Yugoslavia
Olympic Games
Gold medal – first place	1980 Moscow	Light Heavyweight
World Amateur Championships
Bronze medal – third place	1978 Belgrade	Middleweight
Mediterranean Games
Gold medal – first place	1979 Split	Light Heavyweight

Slobodan Kačar (Serbian Cyrillic: Слободан Качар; born 15 September 1957) is a retired Serbian boxer who was the IBF Light-Heavyweight world champion. He won the Light Heavyweight Gold medal for Yugoslavia at the 1980 Summer Olympics.

== Amateur career ==
- Compiled a reported record of 241–9
- Bronze Medal (Middleweight) at the 1978 World Championships in Belgrade
- Gold Medal (Light Heavyweight) representing Yugoslavia at the 1980 Summer Olympics in Moscow
  - Defeated Michael Nassoro (Tanzania) KO 2
  - Defeated David Kvachadze (Soviet Union) points
  - Defeated Herbert Bauch (East Germany) TKO 2
  - Defeated Paweł Skrzecz (Poland) points (4–1)

== Professional career ==
Kačar turned professional in 1983 and won his first 21 fights, including a victory over Eddie Mustafa Muhammad to capture the vacant IBF Light Heavyweight Title. Kačar lost his next fight, a defense against Bobby Czyz in 1986, via 5th-round TKO. Kačar retired the next year with a record of 22–2–0.

== Professional boxing record ==
24 fights	22 wins	2 losses
By knockout	12	2
By decision	10	0

Result	Record	Opponent	Type	Round, time	Date	Location	Notes
Loss	22–2	(United Kingdom) Blaine Logsdon	KO	2 (8)	15/05/1987	(Italy) Mestre	
Win	22–1	(United Kingdom) Danny Lawford	PTS	8 (8)	25/04/1987	(Italy) Acciaroli	
Loss	21–1	(United States) Bobby Czyz	TKO	5 (12)	06/09/1986	(United States) Las Vegas Hilton, Hilton Center, Las Vegas	Lost IBF light heavyweight title
Win	21–0	(United States) Eddie Mustafa Muhammad	SD	15 (15)	21/12/1985	(Italy) Palasport, Pesaro	Won vacant IBF light heavyweight title
Win	20–0	(United States) Clarence Osby	PTS	8 (8)	10/10/1985	(Italy) Fano	
Win	19–0	(Jordan) Ramzi Hassan	UD	10 (10)	08/08/1985	(United States) Americana Congress Hotel, Chicago	
Win	18–0	(United States) Johnny Davis	PTS	10 (10)	14/06/1985	(Italy) Fano	
Win	17–0	(United States) Danny Blake	PTS	10 (10)	12/04/1985	(United States) Americana Congress Hotel, Chicago	
Win	16–0	(United States) Francis Sargent	TKO	4 (10)	25/02/1985	(United States) Americana Congress Hotel, Chicago	
Win	15–0	(Zaire) Pierre Babo Kabassu	PTS	6 (6)	10/12/1984	(France) Palais Omnisport de Paris-Bercy, Paris	
Win	14–0	(Uganda) Peter Mulindwa Kozza	PTS	8 (8)	26/10/1984	(Italy) Jesi	
Win	13–0	(United Kingdom) Chris Lawson	KO	4 (8)	18/05/1984	(Italy) Pesaro	
Win	12–0	(Uganda) Paul Muyodi	TKO	3 (8)	18/04/1984	(Italy) Treviso	
Win	11–0	(Cameroon) Yombo Araka	TKO	4 (8)	25/02/1984	(France) Bercy Stadium, Paris	
Win	10–0	(Uganda) Yawe Davis	PTS	8 (8)	08/02/1984	(Italy) Fano	
Win	9–0	(United States) Hilario Sanchez	KO	2 (8)	06/01/1984	(United States) Convention Center, Miami Beach	
Win	8–0	(Cuba) Enrique Nelson	TKO	3 (6)	08/12/1983	(United States) James Knight Convention Center, Miami	
Win	7–0	(United States) Cyclone Johnson	TKO	5 (6)	03/11/1983	(United States) Miami	
Win	6–0	(Dominican Republic) Jose Perez	TKO	5 (6)	08/10/1983	(United States) Diplomat Hotel, Hollywood	
Win	5–0	(United States) Ricky Johnson	KO	1 (4)	25/08/1983	(United States) Diplomat Hotel, Hollywood	
Win	4–0	(Uruguay) Juan Alberto Barrero	PTS	6 (6)	24/07/1983	(Italy) Roma	
Win	3–0	(Zaire) Mwehu Beya	TKO	3 (6)	11/06/1983	(Italy) Pesaro	
Win	2–0	(Belgium) Sergio Bosio	TKO	2 (6)	09/04/1983	(Italy) Fano	
Win	1–0	(Italy) Gabriele Lazzari	TKO	2 (6)	04/03/1983	(Italy) Pesaro	

== Personal life ==
In 2003, Kačar became president of the Boxing Association of Serbia. His elder brother Tadija Kačar won a silver medal in boxing at the 1976 Summer Olympics. His nephew Gojko Kačar is an international football player.

Achievements
Vacant Title last held by Michael Spinks	IBF light-heavyweight champion 21 December 1985 – 6 September 1986	Succeeded by Bobby Czyz
Awards
Preceded by Miodrag Perunović	Golden Badge; 1980	Succeeded by Borut Petrič
Preceded by Bojan Križaj	Yugoslav Sportsman of the Year; 1980	Succeeded by Borut Petrič
