= Ricardo Rojas Frías =

Cuban boxer (born 1955)

Olympic medal record

Men's Boxing
Bronze medal – third place	1980 Moscow	Light Heavyweight

Ricardo Rojas Frías (born June 15, 1955) is a retired boxer from Cuba, who represented his native country at the 1980 Summer Olympics in Moscow, Soviet Union. There he won the bronze medal in the light heavyweight division (– 81 kg), after being defeated in the semifinals by eventual silver medalist Paweł Skrzecz of Poland.

== 1980 Olympic results ==
- Round of 16: Defeated Ismail Salman (Iraq) by decision, 5-0
- Quarterfinal: Defeated Michael Madsen (Denmark) by decision, 4-1
- Semifinal: Lost to Pawel Skrzecz (Poland) by decision, 2-3 (was awarded bronze medal)
