= Roberto Oviedo =

Argentine boxer

Personal information
- Nationality: Argentine
- Born: 3 April 1960
- Died: 2 May 2026 (aged 66)

Sport
- Sport: Boxing
Medal record
Men's amateur boxing
Representing Argentina
World Cup
Bronze medal – third place	1985 Seoul	Light heavyweight

Roberto Oviedo (3 April 1960 – 2 May 2026) was an Argentine boxer. He competed in the men's light heavyweight event at the 1984 Summer Olympics.
