= Edward Neblett =

Barbadian boxer (born 1964)

Personal information
- Nationality: Barbadian
- Born: 1964 (age 60–61)

Sport
- Sport: Boxing

Edward Neblett (born 1964) is a Barbadian former boxer. He competed in the men's middleweight event at the 1984 Summer Olympics. At the 1984 Summer Olympics, he lost to Virgil Hill of the United States. Neblett also represented Barbados at the 1983 Pan American Games.
