= Pekka Laasanen =

Finnish boxer

Personal information
- Nationality: Finnish
- Born: 2 December 1960 (age 64); Tampere, Finland

Sport
- Sport: Boxing

Pekka Laasanen (born 2 December 1960) is a Finnish boxer. He competed in the men's middleweight event at the 1984 Summer Olympics.
