= Otosico Havili =

Tongan boxer

Personal information
- Nationality: Tongan
- Born: 14 September 1963 (age 62)

Sport
- Sport: Boxing

Otosico Havili (born 14 September 1963) is a Tongan boxer. He competed in the men's middleweight event at the 1984 Summer Olympics. At the 1984 Summer Olympics, he lost to Arístides González of Puerto Rico.
