= Willie Featherstone =

Canadian boxer

Personal information
- Born: 14 May 1959 (age 67) Toronto, Ontario, Canada
- Weight: super middle/light heavyweight

Boxing career
- Stance: Orthodox

Boxing record
- Total fights: 25
- Wins: 19 (KO 11)
- Losses: 5 (KO 1)
- Draws: 1

Willie Featherstone (born May 14, 1959) is a Canadian professional super middle/light heavyweight boxer of the 1970s and '80s who won the Canada light heavyweight title, and Commonwealth light heavyweight title, and was a challenger for the World Boxing Association (WBA) World light heavyweight title against Virgil Hill. He lost this fight by TKO in the 10th round . His professional fighting weight varied from 160 3/4 lb (72.9 kg; 11 st 6.8 lb), i.e. super middleweight to 174 lb (79 kg; 12 st 6 lb), i.e. light heavyweight.
