= Kevin Barry Sr. =

New Zealand boxing trainer

Kevin Barry Sr. ONZM MBE
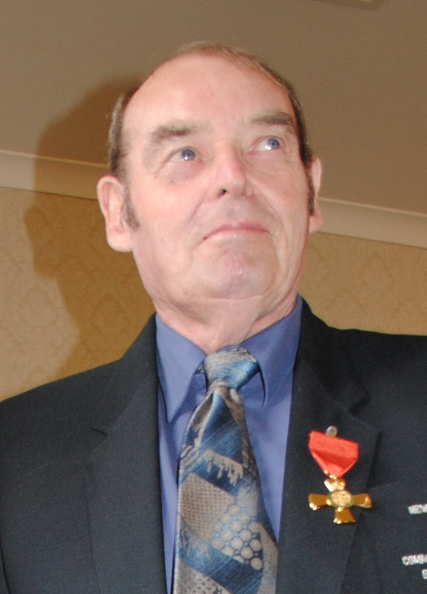
- Barry in 2010
- Born: Kevin Michael Barry; 14 March 1936; New Zealand
- Died: 12 February 2011 (aged 74); Christchurch, New Zealand
- Occupation: Boxing coach
- Relatives: Kevin Barry (son) Bryan Barry (son); Taylor Barry (grandson)

Kevin Michael Barry Sr. ONZM MBE (14 March 1936 – 12 February 2011) was a New Zealand boxing coach.

He trained numerous New Zealand boxers and was one of the country's top boxing coaches for many years. He was appointed a Member of the Order of the British Empire in the 1995 New Year Honours, and an Officer of the New Zealand Order of Merit in the 2010 New Year Honours. He coached his son Kevin Jr. to a silver medal at the 1984 Olympic Games.

Barry died in Christchurch on 12 February 2011 after a long illness, aged 74.
