= Tom Corr =

Irish boxer

Medal record

Men's Boxing

Representing Ireland

World Amateur Championships
Bronze medal – third place	1982 Munich	Light middleweight

Representing Northern Ireland

Commonwealth Games
Bronze medal – third place	1982 Brisbane	Light middleweight

Thomas Corr (born 9 July 1962) is a former amateur boxer. He was born in Ireland. Corr won a bronze medal for Ireland at the 1982 World Amateur Boxing Championships in Munich, West Germany in the light middleweight division. He also won a bronze medal representing Northern Ireland at the 1982 Commonwealth Games.

== 1982 World championships record ==
- Defeated Dennis Milton, (United States) points 3:2
- Defeated Mirosław Kuźma, (Poland) points 3:2
- Lost to Alexander Koshkin, (USSR) points 5:0

== 1982 Commonwealth Games record ==
- Defeated David Hall, (Australia) points
- Defeated Paul Lewis, (Wales) points
- Lost to Shawn O'Sullivan, (Canada) KO Round 2

== 1984 Olympics record ==
- Defeated Arigoma Mayero, (Zimbabwe), points 5:0
- Lost to Jeremiah Okorodudu, (Nigeria) points 4:1
