= David Kvachadze =

Georgian boxer

Personal information
- Nationality: Georgian
- Born: 25 December 1951 (age 74) Tbilisi, Georgian SSR, Soviet Union

Sport
- Sport: Boxing
Medal record
European Championships
Gold medal – first place	1977 Halle	light heavyweight
USSR Boxing Championships
Gold medal – first place	1976 Sverdlovsk	light heavyweight
Gold medal – first place	1977 Frunze	light heavyweight
Gold medal – first place	1980 Rostov	light heavyweight
Silver medal – second place	1978 Tbilisi	light heavyweight
Soviet Spartakiads
Bronze medal – third place	1979 Moscow	light heavyweight

David Kvachadze (born 25 December 1951) is a Georgian boxer. He competed in the men's light heavyweight event at the 1980 Summer Olympics. Won the European 1977 championship and the Soviet championships in 1976, 1977, and 1980. In 1977, he was named the Georgian Athlete of the Year.
