= Anton Josipović =

Bosnia and Herzegovina male boxer

Olympic medal record

Men's boxing
Gold medal – first place	1984 Los Angeles	Light heavyweight

Anton "Ante" Josipović (born 22 October 1961) is a former Yugoslav boxer from Bosnia and Herzegovina (then part of Yugoslavia). He won the light heavyweight gold medal at the 1984 Summer Olympics. He was born in Banja Luka, Bosnia and Herzegovina, Yugoslavia.

== Amateur career ==
=== Olympic results ===
1984 - Olympic Games, Los Angeles, California: Gold Medal (light heavyweight)

- W-PTS 4-1 Markus Bott (Germany),
- W-PTS 5-0 Georgica Donici (Romania),
- W-PTS 5-0 Mustapha Moussa (Algeria),
- W-Forfeit Kevin Barry (New Zealand)

== Pro career ==
Josipović began his professional career in 1990 and won his first eight bouts. In 1994, he took on Asmir Vojnović for the Croatian Cruiserweight Title and lost a decision. In the rematch in 1995, Josipović again lost by decision and retired from boxing.

== Professional boxing record ==
8 Wins (4 knockouts, 4 decisions), 2 Losses (0 knockouts, 2 decisions)
Result	Record	Opponent	Type	Round	Date	Location	Notes
Loss	4-0	(Croatia) Asmir Vojnovic	PTS	10	17/06/1995	Zagreb, Croatia	Croatia Cruiserweight Title.
Loss	3-0	(Croatia) Asmir Vojnovic	UD	10	10/12/1994	Rijeka, Croatia	Croatia Cruiserweight Title.
Win	6-12-1	(Belgium) Albert Toma	TKO	3	09/04/1992	Celano, Abruzzo, Italy	
Win	38-12-3	(United States) Matthew Saad Muhammad	PTS	8	09/05/1991	(Socialist Federal Republic of Yugoslavia) Novi Sad, Yugoslavia	
Win	18-21-4	(United Kingdom) Dave Owens	UD	8	17/02/1991	(Socialist Federal Republic of Yugoslavia) Prijedor, Yugoslavia	
Win	17-6-2	(Socialist Federal Republic of Yugoslavia) Kemper Morton	PTS	8	17/01/1991	(Socialist Federal Republic of Yugoslavia) Sarajevo, Yugoslavia	
Win	1-26-3	(Zaire) Kabunda Kamanga	TKO	4	22/11/1990	(Socialist Federal Republic of Yugoslavia) Zenica, Yugoslavia	
Win	17-17	(Belgium) Yves Monsieur	KO	6	04/10/1990	(Socialist Federal Republic of Yugoslavia) Banja Luka, Yugoslavia	
Win	8-17-3	(Suriname) John Held	PTS	8	25/08/1990	(Socialist Federal Republic of Yugoslavia) Bihać, Yugoslavia	
Win	4-8-3	(Belgium) Renald De Vulder	TKO	4	12/07/1990	(Socialist Federal Republic of Yugoslavia) Doboj, Yugoslavia	

== Personal life ==
He later became a sports journalist and covered Holyfield's career. In 1997, he was shot and seriously wounded by an unidentified assailant in the Bosnian town of Banja Luka.
