= Pedro van Raamsdonk =

Dutch boxer

Medal record

Representing Netherlands

Men's Boxing

World Amateur Championships
Bronze medal – third place	1982 Munich	Middleweight

European Amateur Championships
Silver medal – second place	1981 Tampere	Middleweight

Pedro Johannes van Raamsdonk (born October 2, 1960 in Amsterdam, North Holland) is a retired boxer from the Netherlands, who competed for his native country at the 1984 Summer Olympics in Los Angeles, California. There he was stopped in the quarterfinals of the middleweight division (– 75 kg) by eventual bronze medalist Arístides González of Puerto Rico.

Van Raamsdonk is the first and so far the only boxer without an American passport (he is from the Netherlands) who fought in the National Golden Gloves. He won in 1980 the California Golden Gloves and the bronze medal at the 1981 National Golden Gloves in Toledo, Ohio.
