= Sylvanus Okello =

Kenyan boxer

Personal information
- Nationality: Kenyan
- Born: 14 April 1963 (age 62)

Sport
- Sport: Boxing

Sylvanus Okello (born 14 April 1963) is a Kenyan boxer. He competed in the men's light heavyweight event at the 1984 Summer Olympics.
