= Benny Pike =

Australian boxer

Personal information
- Full name: Geoffrey Benjamin Pike
- Nationality: Australian
- Born: 13 May 1954 (age 70)

Sport
- Sport: Boxing

Geoffrey Benjamin Pike (born 13 May 1954) is an Australian boxer. He competed in the men's light heavyweight event at the 1980 Summer Olympics.
