= Djiguible Traoré =

Malian boxer (born 1960)

Personal information
- Nationality: Malian
- Born: 12 March 1960 (age 65)

Sport
- Sport: Boxing

Djiguible Traoré (born 12 March 1960) is a Malian boxer. He competed in the men's light heavyweight event at the 1984 Summer Olympics.
