= Antonio Corti =

Argentine boxer

Hugo Antonio Corti (born June 3, 1963 in San Martin, Santa Fé) is a retired boxer from Argentina, who competed in the middleweight division (– 71 kg). He represented his native country at the 1984 Summer Olympics in Los Angeles, California. There he was stopped in the second round by Yugoslavia's Damir Škaro. He also represented Argentina at the 1983 Pan American Games. As a professional he had 35 fights (28-1-6), from 1985 to 1994.
