= Arigoma Chiponda =

Zimbabwean boxer (born 1958)

Personal information
- Full name: Arigoma Mayero Chiponda
- Nationality: Zimbabwean
- Born: 3 March 1958 (age 67)

Sport
- Sport: Boxing

Arigoma Mayero Chiponda (born 3 March 1958) is a Zimbabwean boxer. He competed in the men's middleweight event at the 1984 Summer Olympics. At the 1984 Summer Olympics, he lost to Tom Corr of Ireland
