= Bozhidar Ivanov (boxer) =

Bulgarian boxer

Personal information
- Nationality: Bulgarian
- Born: 17 September 1956 (age 68)

Sport
- Sport: Boxing

Bozhidar Ivanov (born 17 September 1956) is a Bulgarian boxer. He competed in the men's light heavyweight event at the 1980 Summer Olympics. At the 1980 Summer Olympics, he lost to Herbert Bauch of East Germany.
