= Juha Hänninen =

Finnish boxer

Personal information
- Nationality: Finnish
- Born: 11 September 1959 (age 65); Oulu, Finland

Sport
- Sport: Boxing

Juha Hänninen (born 11 September 1959) is a Finnish politician from the National Coalition Party and former boxer. Hänninen is a member of the Parliament of Finland (MP). He was elected as a member of Finnish Parliament in April 2023 with 5251 personal votes from Oulu. He competed in the men's light heavyweight event at the 1984 Summer Olympics.
