= Virgil Hill =

American boxer (born 1964)

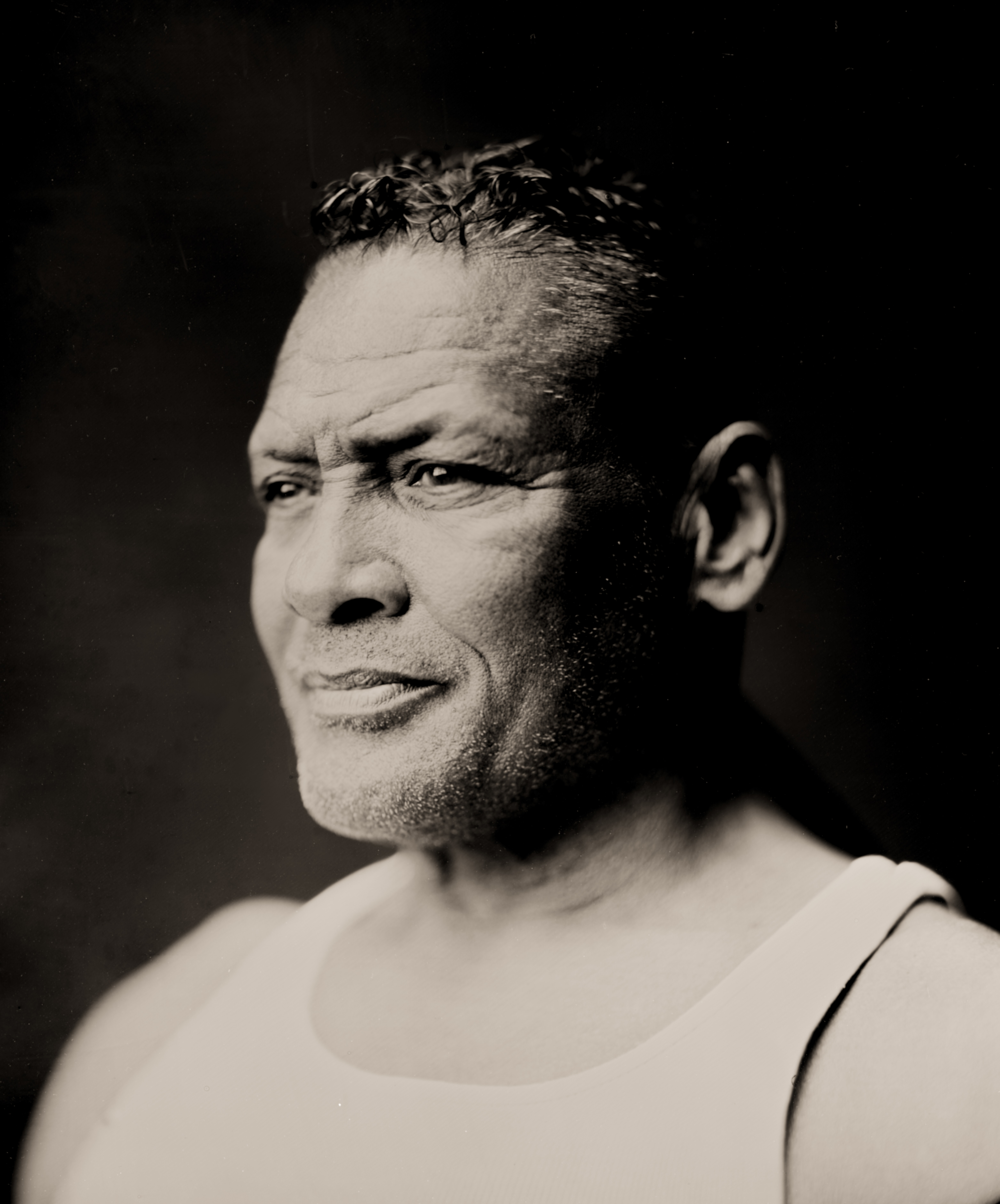
- Hill in 2015

Personal information
- Nickname: Quicksilver
- Born: Virgil Eugene Hill; January 18, 1964 (age 62) Clinton, Missouri, U.S.
- Height: 6 ft 0 1/2 in (184 cm)
- Weight: Light heavyweight; Cruiserweight

Boxing career
- Reach: 77 in (196 cm)
- Stance: Orthodox

Boxing record
- Total fights: 58
- Wins: 51
- Win by KO: 24
- Losses: 7
Medal record
Men's amateur boxing
Representing United States
Olympic Games
Silver medal – second place	1984 Los Angeles	Middleweight
World Cup
Bronze medal – third place	1983 Rome	Middleweight

Virgil Eugene Hill (born January 18, 1964) is an American former professional boxer who competed between 1984 and 2015. He is a world champion in two weight classes, having held the World Boxing Association (WBA) light heavyweight title twice, from 1987 to 1997; the International Boxing Federation (IBF) light heavyweight title from 1996 to 1997; and the WBA cruiserweight title between 2000 and 2002. He also held the WBA (Regular) cruiserweight title between 2006 and 2007. As an amateur, Hill won a silver medal in the middleweight division at the 1984 Summer Olympics. In 2013, he was inducted into the International Boxing Hall of Fame.

== Amateur career ==
At the 1984 Summer Olympics Hill represented the United States as a Middleweight then age 20, and won a silver medal in a close decision loss in the 165-lb final. His results were:

- Defeated (Barbados) Edward Neblett RSC 2
- Defeated (United Kingdom) Brian Schumacher 5–0
- Defeated (Socialist Federal Republic of Yugoslavia) Damir Škaro 4–1
- Defeated (Algeria) Mohamed Zaoui 5–0
- Lost to (South Korea) Shin Joon-Sup 2–3

Hill was the 1984 National Golden Gloves champion at Middleweight. Hill ended his amateur career with a record of 288–11.

== Professional career ==
=== Light-heavyweight ===
In September 1987, after going eighteen straight fights without a loss to start his pro career, Hill aka 'Quicksilver' (his nickname) was a challenger to Leslie Stewart of Trinidad for the latter's World Boxing Association light-heavyweight title in Atlantic City. After an even match in the early going, Hill floored the defending title holder twice in the fourth round – first with a left hook and the second time with an uppercut – to take the title on a Knockout win.

A series of ten successful defenses followed, eight of which took place in Bismarck, North Dakota. Hill received offers to fight in Las Vegas and other cities, but chose the place of his 'roots' and 'hometown fans' to be the place of the majority of his defenses. Opponents in his first run as champion included Bobby Czyz and James Kinchen. Superstar Thomas Hearns would meet – and defeat – Hill in Las Vegas by decision in June 1991 to end Hill's first reign as champion.

In September 1992, it was Hill pitted against 1984 Olympic teammate Frank Tate for the vacant WBA 175-lb. title. It was a 'grudge match' between the two, and Hill won the title on his home turf of Bismarck. Another string of ten defenses would follow, including a rematch with Tate, a close decision over Lou Del Valle who almost upset Hill.

==== Unification matches ====
In November 1996 at the Olympiahalle, Munich, Hill won over the undefeated IBF champion Henry Maske to unify the WBA/IBF belts and win the vacant Lineal championship. In June 1997, WBO champion Dariusz Michalczewski scored a unanimous decision over Hill to unify the WBA, IBF, WBO and Lineal light-heavyweight titles at Arena Oberhausen, Oberhausen, Germany.

Hill boxed against Roy Jones Jr. the following year, and was stopped in round four with a body shot.

=== Cruiserweight ===
The aging Hill won the WBA cruiserweight title at age 36 by knocking down Fabrice Tiozzo three times in Villeurbanne, France, by TKO in the first. He made his first defense, also in France, against Jean-Marc Mormeck, but would lose both match and title on cuts after nine rounds. In July 2003 he decisioned Donny Lalonde in a North Dakota-Manitoba 'border fight'. He lost a disputed decision to Mormeck in a title rematch in South Africa in May 2004.

On January 27, 2006, Virgil Hill won over previously undefeated Russian cruiserweight Valery Brudov by unanimous decision to win the 'regular' WBA cruiserweight title, as the WBA had now created a WBA "Super" title beside the standard WBA title. Despite being cut on the face in the sixth round, Hill was able to out hustle and out work his much younger opponent to capture his fifth world title at the age of 42.

He had his next to last fight in Germany on March 31, 2007, facing Henry Maske, whom he had beaten in 1996. Maske had announced his retirement prior to that fight and was frustrated to end his career with a split-decision loss, the only loss in his professional career. When he heard about Hill capturing the world title again at the age of 42, he decided to challenge him for a rematch. Hill lost the Maske rematch by decision in a non-title bout, then lost to Firat Arslan by decision to lose his WBA cruiserweight title.

He retired with a record of 50 wins (23 KOs) and 7 losses.

On July 16, 2011, Hill worked with his wife, Carla Hill, for their first ever boxing card and promotion at Resorts Casino Hotel in Atlantic City, New Jersey,

=== Hall of Fame ===
On November 12, 2012, he was officially inducted into the International Boxing Hall of Fame, Class of 2013.

== Personal life ==
Hill's wife, Denean Howard, is a former Olympic athlete. They met while competing at the 1984 Summer Olympics. His daughter, Azaria Hill, is a bobsledder for Team USA.

== Professional boxing record ==
58 fights	51 wins	7 losses
By knockout	24	2
By decision	27	5

No.	Result	Record	Opponent	Type	Round, time	Date	Location	Notes
58	Win	51–7	Jimmy Campbell	TKO	2 (8), 2:00	Feb 28, 2015	Civic Center, Bismarck, North Dakota, U.S.	
57	Loss	50–7	Firat Arslan	UD	12	Nov 24, 2007	Freiberger Arena, Dresden, Germany	Lost WBA (Regular) cruiserweight title
56	Loss	50–6	Henry Maske	UD	12	Mar 31, 2007	Olympiahalle, Munich, Germany	
55	Win	50–5	Valery Brudov	UD	12	Jan 27, 2006	Tropicana Casino & Resort, Atlantic City, New Jersey, U.S.	Won vacant WBA (Regular) cruiserweight title
54	Loss	49–5	Jean-Marc Mormeck	UD	12	May 22, 2004	Carnival City, Brakpan, South Africa	For WBA cruiserweight title
53	Win	49–4	Donny Lalonde	UD	10	Jul 5, 2003	CanWest Global Park, Winnipeg, Manitoba, Canada	
52	Win	48–4	Joey DeGrandis	UD	12	Nov 17, 2002	Ralph Engelstad Arena, Grand Forks, North Dakota, U.S.	Won vacant IBC cruiserweight title
51	Win	47–4	Carlos Bates	TKO	1 (12), 1:50	Aug 23, 2002	4 Bears Casino & Lodge, New Town, North Dakota, U.S.	
50	Loss	46–4	Jean-Marc Mormeck	RTD	8 (12), 3:00	Feb 23, 2002	Palais des Sports, Marseille, France	Lost WBA cruiserweight title
49	Win	46–3	Fabrice Tiozzo	TKO	1 (12), 2:59	Dec 9, 2000	Astroballe, Lyon, France	Won WBA cruiserweight title
48	Win	45–3	Glenn Thomas	UD	10	May 9, 1999	Municipal Auditorium, Minot, North Dakota, U.S.	
47	Win	44–3	James Hayes	KO	2 (12), 2:27	Nov 7, 1998	Civic Center, Bismarck, North Dakota, U.S.	Won vacant IBC cruiserweight title
46	Loss	43–3	Roy Jones Jr.	KO	4 (12), 1:10	Apr 25, 1998	Coast Coliseum, Biloxi, Mississippi, U.S.	
45	Loss	43–2	Dariusz Michalczewski	UD	12	Jun 13, 1997	Arena Oberhausen, Oberhausen, Germany	Lost WBA and IBF light heavyweight titles; For WBO light heavyweight title
44	Win	43–1	Henry Maske	SD	12	Nov 23, 1996	Olympiahalle, Munich, Germany	Retained WBA light heavyweight title; Won IBF light heavyweight title
43	Win	42–1	Lou Del Valle	UD	12	Apr 20, 1996	Ralph Engelstad Arena, Grand Forks, North Dakota, U.S.	Retained WBA light heavyweight title
42	Win	41–1	Drake Thadzi	UD	12	Sep 2, 1995	Wembley Stadium, London, England	Retained WBA light heavyweight title
41	Win	40–1	Crawford Ashley	UD	12	Apr 1, 1995	Star of the Desert Arena, Primm, Nevada, U.S.	Retained WBA light heavyweight title
40	Win	39–1	Frank Tate	UD	12	Jul 23, 1994	Civic Center, Bismarck, North Dakota, U.S.	Retained WBA light heavyweight title
39	Win	38–1	Guy Waters	UD	12	Dec 17, 1993	Municipal Auditorium, Minot, North Dakota, U.S.	Retained WBA light heavyweight title
38	Win	37–1	Saúl Montana	TKO	10 (12), 2:26	Nov 9, 1993	Fargodome, Fargo, North Dakota, U.S.	Retained WBA light heavyweight title
37	Win	36–1	Sergio Daniel Merani	UD	12	Aug 28, 1993	Civic Center, Bismarck, North Dakota, U.S.	Retained WBA light heavyweight title
36	Win	35–1	Fabrice Tiozzo	SD	12	Apr 3, 1993	Palais des sports Marcel-Cerdan, Paris, France	Retained WBA light heavyweight title
35	Win	34–1	Adolpho Washington	TD	11 (12)	Feb 20, 1993	Fargodome, Fargo, North Dakota, U.S.	Retained WBA light heavyweight title; Unanimous TD after Washington was cut by bumping his head against a TV camera
34	Win	33–1	Frank Tate	UD	12	Sep 29, 1992	Civic Center, Bismarck, North Dakota, U.S.	Won vacant WBA light heavyweight title
33	Win	32–1	Lottie Mwale	KO	4 (12), 1:44	Apr 11, 1992	Civic Center, Bismarck, North Dakota, U.S.	Won WBC International light heavyweight title
32	Win	31–1	Aundrey Nelson	UD	10	Mar 1, 1992	Princes Park, Melbourne, Australia	
31	Loss	30–1	Thomas Hearns	UD	12	Jun 3, 1991	Caesars Palace, Paradise, Nevada, U.S.	Lost WBA light heavyweight title
30	Win	30–0	Mike Peak	UD	12	Jan 6, 1991	Civic Center, Bismarck, North Dakota, U.S.	Retained WBA light heavyweight title
29	Win	29–0	Frank Minton	TKO	9 (10)	Oct 27, 1990	Civic Center, Bismarck, North Dakota, U.S.	
28	Win	28–0	Tyrone Frazier	UD	12	Jul 7, 1990	Civic Center, Bismarck, North Dakota, U.S.	Retained WBA light heavyweight title
27	Win	27–0	David Vedder	UD	12	Feb 25, 1990	Civic Center, Bismarck, North Dakota, U.S.	Retained WBA light heavyweight title
26	Win	26–0	James Kinchen	TKO	1 (12), 2:52	Oct 24, 1989	Civic Center, Bismarck, North Dakota, U.S.	Retained WBA light heavyweight title
25	Win	25–0	Joe Lasisi	TKO	7 (12), 1:56	May 27, 1989	Civic Center, Bismarck, North Dakota, U.S.	Retained WBA light heavyweight title
24	Win	24–0	Bobby Czyz	UD	12	Mar 4, 1989	Civic Center, Bismarck, North Dakota, U.S.	Retained WBA light heavyweight title
23	Win	23–0	Willie Featherstone	TKO	10 (12), 2:05	Nov 11, 1988	Civic Center, Bismarck, North Dakota, U.S.	Retained WBA light heavyweight title
22	Win	22–0	Ramzi Hassan	UD	12	Jun 6, 1988	Las Vegas Hilton, Winchester, Nevada, U.S.	Retained WBA light heavyweight title
21	Win	21–0	Jean-Marie Emebe	TKO	11 (12), 1:29	Apr 3, 1988	Civic Center, Bismarck, North Dakota, U.S.	Retained WBA light heavyweight title
20	Win	20–0	Rufino Angulo	UD	12	Nov 21, 1987	Stade Pierre de Coubertin, Paris, France	Retained WBA light heavyweight title
19	Win	19–0	Leslie Stewart	TKO	4 (12), 3:07	Sep 5, 1987	Trump Plaza Hotel and Casino, Atlantic City, New Jersey, U.S.	Won WBA light heavyweight title
18	Win	18–0	Junior Edmonds	UD	10	Jul 19, 1987	All Seasons Arena, Minot, North Dakota, U.S.	
17	Win	17–0	Marcos Geraldo	KO	2 (10)	Jun 13, 1987	Lake Tahoe, Nevada, U.S.	
16	Win	16–0	Marvin Camel	KO	1, 2:52	May 1, 1987	City Arena, Grand Forks, North Dakota, U.S.	
15	Win	15–0	James Williams	KO	4	Mar 6, 1987	Fargo, North Dakota, U.S.	
14	Win	14–0	Clarence Osby	UD	12	Dec 11, 1986	Felt Forum, New York City, New York, U.S.	Won vacant WBC Continental Americas light heavyweight title
13	Win	13–0	Eric Winbush	UD	10	Oct 17, 1986	Civic Center, Bismarck, North Dakota, U.S.	
12	Win	12–0	Wayne Caplette	KO	1	Oct 4, 1986	Williston, North Dakota, U.S.	
11	Win	11–0	Marcus Dorsey	KO	2	Aug 14, 1986	Edmonds Community College, Lynnwood, Washington, U.S.	
10	Win	10–0	Willie Mayberry	TKO	1	Aug 2, 1986	Detroit Lakes, Minnesota, U.S.	
9	Win	9–0	Mike Sedillo	UD	10	Jul 10, 1986	The Forum, Inglewood, California, U.S.	
8	Win	8–0	Santiago Valdez	KO	1, 1:32	Jun 30, 1986	Pacific Ramada Hotel, Everett, Washington, U.S.	
7	Win	7–0	Abdul Hakim	TKO	4 (8), 0:57	Apr 30, 1986	Broadway by the Bay Theater, Atlantic City, New Jersey, U.S.	
6	Win	6–0	James Williamson	TKO	6, 0:57	Mar 2, 1986	Host Resort, Lancaster, Pennsylvania, U.S.	
5	Win	5–0	Fred Jordan	TKO	4 (6), 1:59	Jan 22, 1986	Broadway by the Bay Theater, Atlantic City, New Jersey, U.S.	
4	Win	4–0	Dawud Shaw	UD	6	Jul 13, 1985	Atlantis Hotel and Casino, Atlantic City, New Jersey, U.S.	
3	Win	3–0	David Vedder	UD	6	Feb 16, 1985	Lawlor Events Center, Reno, Nevada, U.S.	
2	Win	2–0	John Tyrell	TKO	1 (6), 1:12	Jan 5, 1985	Broadway by the Bay Theater, Atlantic City, New Jersey, U.S.	
1	Win	1–0	Arthur Wright	TKO	2, 2:05	Nov 15, 1984	Madison Square Garden, New York City, New York, U.S.	

== Titles in boxing ==
=== Major world titles ===
- IBF light heavyweight champion (175 lbs)
- WBA light heavyweight champion (175 lbs) (2x)
- WBA cruiserweight champion (200 lbs)

=== Secondary major world titles ===
- WBA (Regular) cruiserweight champion (200 lbs)

=== Minor world titles ===
- IBC cruiserweight champion (200 lbs) (2x)

=== Regional/International titles ===
- WBC Continental Americas light heavyweight champion (175 lbs)
- WBC International light heavyweight champion (175 lbs)

== See also ==
- List of light heavyweight boxing champions
- List of WBA world champions
- List of IBF world champions

Sporting positions
Amateur boxing titles
Previous: Arthur Jimmerson	U.S. Golden Gloves middleweight champion 1984	Next: William Guthrie
Regional boxing titles
Vacant Title last held by J.B. Williamson	WBC Continental Americas light heavyweight champion December 11, 1986 – May 1987; Vacated	Vacant Title next held by Donny Lalonde
Preceded by Lottie Mwale	WBC International light heavyweight champion April 11, 1992 – September 1992; Vacated	Vacant Title next held by Jimmy Joseph
Minor world boxing titles
Vacant Title last held by Robert Daniels	IBC cruiserweight champion November 7, 1998 – 2000; Vacated	Vacant Title next held by Himself
Vacant Title last held by Himself	IBC cruiserweight champion November 17, 2002 – 2004; Vacated	Vacant Title next held by Krzysztof Włodarczyk
Major world boxing titles
Preceded by Leslie Stewart	WBA light heavyweight champion September 5, 1987 – June 3, 1991	Succeeded by Thomas Hearns
Vacant Title last held by Iran Barkley	WBA light heavyweight champion September 29, 1992 – June 13, 1997	Succeeded by Dariusz Michalczewski
Preceded by Henry Maske	IBF light heavyweight champion November 23, 1996 – June 13, 1997	Succeeded by Dariusz Michalczewski
Vacant Title last held by Michael Spinks	Lineal light heavyweight champion November 23, 1996 – June 13, 1997	Succeeded by Dariusz Michalczewski
Preceded by Fabrice Tiozzo	WBA cruiserweight champion December 9, 2000 – February 23, 2002	Succeeded by Jean-Marc Mormeck
New title	WBA (Regular) cruiserweight champion January 27, 2006 – November 24, 2007	Succeeded by Firat Arslan
Awards
Previous: Michael Carbajal	The Ring Comeback of the Year; 2000	Next: John Michael Johnson
Records
Previous: Bob Foster; 13	Most opponents beaten for the world light heavyweight title 21; August 28, 1993 – present	Incumbent
Previous: Bob Foster; 14	Most successful world light heavyweight title defenses 20; November 23, 1996 – April 20, 2002; 15th defense on December 17, 1993	Next: Dariusz Michalczewski; 23
Previous: Johnny Nelson	Oldest cruiserweight world champion January 27, 2006 – present	Incumbent
