= Brian Schumacher =

British boxer

Personal information
- Born: 14 May 1960 (age 66) Liverpool, England
- Years active: 1980-1990
- Height: 191 cm (6 ft 3 in)
- Weight: 75 kg (165 lb; 11 st 11 lb)

Sport
- Sport: Boxing

Brian Schumacher (born 14 May 1960) is a British boxer. He competed in the men's middleweight event at the 1984 Summer Olympics. Schumacher served in the Royal Navy as a mine clearance diver in the Falklands while boxing for the British Combined Services.

== Amateur career ==
Schumacher won the 1981 and 1984 Amateur Boxing Association British middleweight title, when boxing for the Royal Navy.

At the 1984 Summer Olympics Schumacher represented the United Kingdom in place of 19-year-old national champion Michael Watson. Silver medalist Virgil Hill defeated Schumacher 5-0 in the middleweight contest.

A win in October 1984 against Rick Duff was his final amateur fight before turning pro. His amateur record was eighteen wins, five by knock out, with five losses.

== Professional career ==
=== Light-heavyweight ===
Schumacher debuted as a pro on 20 February 1986 with a win against Geoff Rymer in Yorkshire. His professional career ended June 1990 with a record of eleven consecutive wins, seven by knock-out, followed by five losses, all by TKO.

== Personal life ==
He served 23 years in prison for murdering his mother's partner, Peter Colleran, on 9 September 1996.
