= Philip Pinder =

Bahamian boxer (born 1964)

Personal information
- Nationality: Bahamian
- Born: 19 August 1964 (age 61)

Sport
- Sport: Boxing

Philip Pinder (born 19 August 1964) is a Bahamian boxer. He competed in the men's light heavyweight event at the 1984 Summer Olympics.
