= Anthony Longdon =

Grenadian boxer

Personal information
- Nationality: Grenadian

Sport
- Sport: Boxing

Anthony Longdon is a Grenadian boxer. He competed in the men's light heavyweight event at the 1984 Summer Olympics.
