= Boxing at the 1984 Summer Olympics =

Boxing at the Games of the XXIII Olympiad
- Dates: 29 July-11 August 1984
- Competitors: 354 from 81 nations

Boxing at the 1984 Summer Olympics took place in the Memorial Sports Arena in Los Angeles, California, United States. The boxing schedule began on July 29 and ended on August 11. Twelve boxing events were contested with the participation of 354 fighters from 81 countries. A Soviet-led boycott resulted in the withdrawals of the Soviet Union, Cuba, East Germany, Bulgaria and other Eastern Bloc nations from boxing competitions.

At the 1980 Summer Olympics, that was impacted by an American-led boycott, Cuban boxers won 10 medals, with 6 of them being gold, and had again been expected to do well. However, the nation withdrew from the games following the announcement of the Soviet boycott. Teófilo Stevenson, who was going to try for his fourth Olympic gold medal before the boycott was officially announced, had previously defeated Tyrell Biggs twice (one by knockout) and Hermenegildo Báez had previously defeated Henry Tillman. Soviet Alexander Yagubkin defeated both Biggs and Tillman during the USA–USSR duals. Cuban and Soviet boxers, however, were more seasoned than their American counterparts. While US athletes typically turned pro after the Olympics, while still in their early twenties, Cubans and the Soviets were not allowed to do so and stayed on in the amateurs, participating in multiple Olympic cycles.

Evander Holyfield was controversially disqualified in the Light heavyweight semifinals for punching New Zealand boxer Kevin Barry after what seemed to be a stop. However, replay shows that the referee stopped the bout after his punches. Under IABA health regulation Barry was not allowed to box for 28 days, so he was scratched from the final, giving Yugoslav boxer Anton Josipović the uncontested gold medal. During the medal ceremony, Josipović pulled bronze medalist Holyfield onto the highest step of the podium and raised his hand, acknowledging that Holyfield deserved to compete in the final.

Due to the increasing size of heavyweight boxers (which put lighter heavyweights at a disadvantage), the Heavyweight division was split in two. The boxers above 200 pounds, were placed in the newly created Super Heavyweight division.

== Medal table ==
Rank	Nation	Gold	Silver	Bronze	Total
1	United States*	9	1	1	11
2	Italy	1	2	2	5
3	Yugoslavia	1	1	2	4
4	South Korea	1	1	1	3
5	Canada	0	2	1	3
6	Puerto Rico	0	1	1	2
7	Mexico	0	1	0	1
7	New Zealand	0	1	0	1
7	Nigeria	0	1	0	1
7	Thailand	0	1	0	1
11	Algeria	0	0	2	2
11	Turkey	0	0	2	2
11	Venezuela	0	0	2	2
14	Cameroon	0	0	1	1
14	Dominican Republic	0	0	1	1
14	Finland	0	0	1	1
14	France	0	0	1	1
14	Great Britain	0	0	1	1
14	Kenya	0	0	1	1
14	Netherlands	0	0	1	1
14	Romania	0	0	1	1
14	West Germany	0	0	1	1
14	Zambia	0	0	1	1
Totals (23 entries)		12	12	24	48

== Medal summary ==
Event	Gold	Silver	Bronze
Light flyweight (–48 kg)	Paul Gonzales; United States	Salvatore Todisco; Italy	Marcelino Bolivar; Venezuela
Light flyweight (–48 kg)	Paul Gonzales; United States	Salvatore Todisco; Italy	Keith Mwila; Zambia
Flyweight (–51 kg)	Steve McCrory; United States	Redžep Redžepovski; Yugoslavia	Eyüp Can; Turkey
Flyweight (–51 kg)	Steve McCrory; United States	Redžep Redžepovski; Yugoslavia	Ibrahim Bilali; Kenya
Bantamweight (–54 kg)	Maurizio Stecca; Italy	Héctor López; Mexico	Dale Walters; Canada
Bantamweight (–54 kg)	Maurizio Stecca; Italy	Héctor López; Mexico	Pedro Nolasco; Dominican Republic
Featherweight (–57 kg)	Meldrick Taylor; United States	Peter Konyegwachie; Nigeria	Omar Catarí; Venezuela
Featherweight (–57 kg)	Meldrick Taylor; United States	Peter Konyegwachie; Nigeria	Turgut Aykaç; Turkey
Lightweight (–60 kg)	Pernell Whitaker; United States	Luis Ortiz; Puerto Rico	Chun Chil-Sung; South Korea
Lightweight (–60 kg)	Pernell Whitaker; United States	Luis Ortiz; Puerto Rico	Martin Ndongo-Ebanga; Cameroon
Light welterweight (–63 kg)	Jerry Page; United States	Dhawee Umponmaha; Thailand	Mircea Fulger; Romania
Light welterweight (–63 kg)	Jerry Page; United States	Dhawee Umponmaha; Thailand	Mirko Puzović; Yugoslavia
Welterweight (–67 kg)	Mark Breland; United States	An Young-Su; South Korea	Joni Nyman; Finland
Welterweight (–67 kg)	Mark Breland; United States	An Young-Su; South Korea	Luciano Bruno; Italy
Light middleweight (–71 kg)	Frank Tate; United States	Shawn O'Sullivan; Canada	Christophe Tiozzo; France
Light middleweight (–71 kg)	Frank Tate; United States	Shawn O'Sullivan; Canada	Manfred Zielonka; West Germany
Middleweight (–75 kg)	Shin Joon-Sup; South Korea	Virgil Hill; United States	Aristides González; Puerto Rico
Middleweight (–75 kg)	Shin Joon-Sup; South Korea	Virgil Hill; United States	Mohamed Zaoui; Algeria
Light heavyweight (–81 kg)	Anton Josipović; Yugoslavia	Kevin Barry; New Zealand	Evander Holyfield; United States
Light heavyweight (–81 kg)	Anton Josipović; Yugoslavia	Kevin Barry; New Zealand	Mustapha Moussa; Algeria
Heavyweight (–91 kg)	Henry Tillman; United States	Willie DeWit; Canada	Angelo Musone; Italy
Heavyweight (–91 kg)	Henry Tillman; United States	Willie DeWit; Canada	Arnold Vanderlyde; Netherlands
Super heavyweight (+ 91 kg)	Tyrell Biggs; United States	Francesco Damiani; Italy	Robert Wells; Great Britain
Super heavyweight (+ 91 kg)	Tyrell Biggs; United States	Francesco Damiani; Italy	Aziz Salihu; Yugoslavia

== See also ==
- Boxing at the Friendship Games
