= Moses Mwaba =

Zambian boxer

Personal information
- Nationality: Zambian

Sport
- Sport: Boxing

Moses Mwaba is a Zambian boxer. He competed in the men's middleweight event at the 1984 Summer Olympics.
