= Mohamed Zaoui =

Algerian boxer (born 1960)

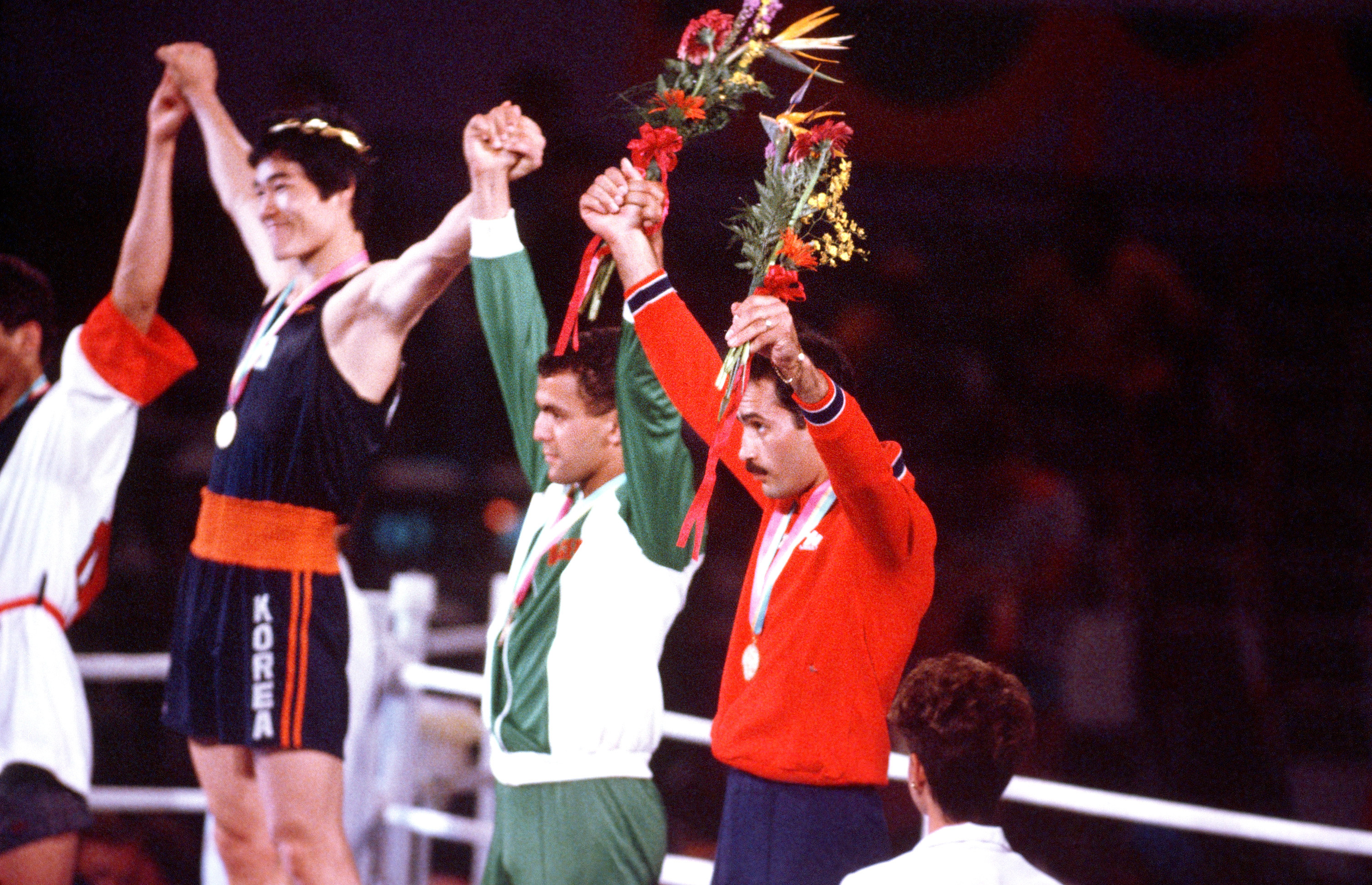
- Zaoui (in white and green) at the 1984 Olympics.

Medal record

Men's boxing
Bronze medal – third place	1984 Los Angeles	Middleweight

Mohamed Zaoui (born 14 May 1960) is a former middleweight boxer from Algeria. He won the bronze medal at the 1984 Summer Olympics in Los Angeles, becoming the first Algerian to ever win a medal at the Olympic Games.

== Personal ==
Zaoui was born in the village of Zaouiet Yagoubi, near Nedroma, in the Tlemcen Province. When he was just five months old, he emigrated with his family to Évin-Malmaison, France.

== Career ==
Zaoui won the bronze medal in the Middleweight division (71–75 kg) at the 1984 Summer Olympics in Los Angeles. He shared the podium with Puerto Rico's Arístides González.

=== Career ===
- (bronze) Olympic Games 1984 Los Angeles, USA (75 kg)
- Quarter-finals World Cup – Seoul, South Korea 1985 (75 kg)

=== International tournaments ===
- (gold) 24 Fevrier Tournament – Algiers, Algeria 1985 (75 kg)
