= Don Smith (boxer) =

Trinidad and Tobago boxer (born 1963)

Personal information
- Full name: Donald Smith
- Nationality: Trinidad and Tobago
- Born: 6 September 1963 (age 61)

Sport
- Sport: Boxing

Donald Smith (born 6 September 1963) is a Trinidad and Tobago boxer. He competed in the men's light heavyweight event at the 1984 Summer Olympics.
