= Taylor Barry =

New Zealand boxing trainer

- Born: Taylor Michael Barry; 28 February 1995 (age 31); Auckland, New Zealand
- Occupation: Boxing coach
- Years active: 2014–present
- Parents: Kevin Barry (father); Tanya Moss (mother)
- Relatives: Kevin Barry Sr. (grandfather)

Taylor Barry (born 28 February 1995, Auckland, New Zealand) is a New Zealand boxing trainer based in Las Vegas. Barry is the son of Olympic silver medalist and New Zealand boxing legend; trainer and manager Kevin Barry. Taylor has moved into the realm of coaching professional fighters including WBO world champion Joseph Parker. Barry helped Joseph Parker in his World Title fight in December 2016.

== Notable boxers trained ==
- (New Zealand) Joseph Parker
- (Russia) Umar Salamov
- (Italy) Guido Vianello
- (Poland) Izu Ugonoh

== Personal life ==
Barry was born in New Zealand but was educated in America. He played American Football for his high school and for the Nevada Spartans. He was comfortable playing either side of the ball, defensive end or tight end. Barry's twin brother Mitchell, also played football. Barry is very close to Joseph Parker as they consider each other as brothers. Barry is the son of Rhythmic Gymnastics Olympian Tanya Moss.
