= Jonathan Kiriisa =

Ugandan boxer

Personal information
- Nationality: Ugandan
- Born: 23 June 1959 (age 65)

Sport
- Sport: Boxing

Jonathan Kiriisa (born 23 June 1959) is a Ugandan boxer. He competed in the men's light heavyweight event at the 1984 Summer Olympics.

== Professional boxing record ==
3 fights	2 wins	1 loss
By knockout	1	0
By decision	1	1

No.	Result	Record	Opponent	Type	Round, time	Date	Location	Notes
3	Win	2–1	(United States) Odell Jones	TKO	2 (4), 0:50	15 Apr 1986	(United States) 5th Regiment Armory, Baltimore, Maryland, U.S.	
2	Loss	1–1	(United States) Al Shoffner	UD	6	27 Feb 1986	(United States) Pikesville Armory, Pikesville, Maryland, U.S.	
1	Win	1–0	(United States) Alex Stanley	PTS	4	7 Nov 1985	(United States) Pikesville Armory, Pikesville, Maryland, U.S.	
