= Christer Corpi =

Swedish boxer

Personal information
- Nationality: Swedish
- Born: 28 March 1960 (age 65); Stockholm, Sweden

Sport
- Sport: Boxing

Christer Corpi (born 28 March 1960) is a Swedish boxer. He competed at the 1980 Summer Olympics and the 1984 Summer Olympics.
