= Barry Taylor (Barnsley F.C.) =

British association football executive

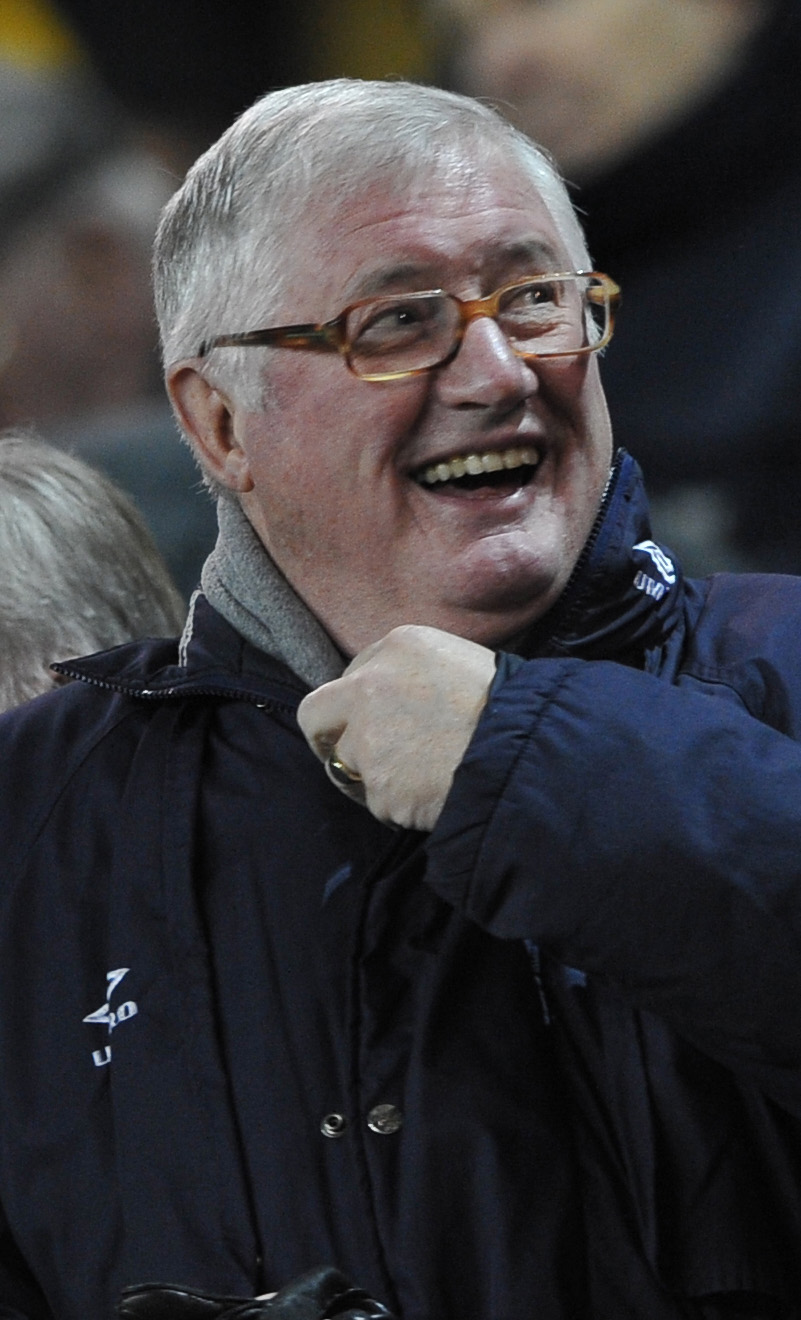
Barry Taylor

Barry Taylor is an Honorary Life President of Barnsley Football Club.

== History ==
In 1957 Taylor captained the Barnsley Boys to win the English Schools Football Shield in front of 20,000 people at Barnsley. Signed for Barnsley in 1957 but did not make the grade.

Taylor was a director of Barnsley Football Club between 1984 and 2018.

Since 1991 he was a member of the Football Association Council, representing full member clubs in Yorkshire and East Midlands. Serving on three of the most prestigious committees, International, FA Challenge Cup and Protocol and was Chairman of the FA Challenge Cup Committee from 2003 to 2008 which included the opening of the new Wembley Stadium.

In 1997 he sold his outside business interests and retired.

Since 2003, he is a UEFA delegate, responsible for supervising the orderly organisation of the match and for ensuring UEFA’s competition Regulations and Instructions for Safety and Security inside and outside the Stadium before, during and after a match in the Champions League and UEFA Cup. Make contact with the match organisers, with the visiting team and the referee, Chair the Organisational match meetings sending a full report to UEFA. Barry Taylor has virtually worked in every country in Europe, also Russia and Israel.

In 2011 Taylor was elected Vice President of the Football Association, and elected Honorary Life President of Barnsley Football Club.

=== Other past external directorships ===
- Barnsley District General NHS Trust
- Solway International
- Barnsley Premier Leisure
