= Arcadio Fuentes =

Puerto Rican boxer

Personal information
- Nationality: Puerto Rican
- Born: September 11, 1965 (age 61)

Sport
- Sport: Boxing

Arcadio Fuentes (born 11 September 1965) is a Puerto Rican boxer. He competed in the men's light heavyweight event at the 1984 Summer Olympics.
