= Antonio Portela =

Puerto Rican swimmer (born 1966)

Personal information
- Born: April 21, 1966 (age 60)

Sport
- Sport: Swimming

Antonio Portela (born 21 April 1966) is a Puerto Rican former swimmer who competed in the 1984 Summer Olympics. He finished twenty-seventh in the 100m freestyle and fourteenth in the 4x400m freestyle relay.
