= Herbert Bauch =

East German boxer

Medal record

Men's Boxing

Representing East Germany

Olympic Games
Bronze medal – third place	1980 Moscow	Light heavyweight

World Amateur Championships
Bronze medal – third place	1978 Belgrade	Light heavyweight

Herbert Bauch (born 18 May 1957 in Berlin) is a retired boxer, who represented East Germany at the 1980 Summer Olympics in Moscow, Soviet Union. There he won the bronze medal in the light heavyweight division (– 81 kg), after being defeated in the semifinals by eventual gold medalist Slobodan Kačar of Yugoslavia. Two years earlier he captured the bronze medal at the second World Championships in Belgrade.

== 1980 Olympic results ==
Below are the results of Herbert Bauch, an East German light heavyweight boxer who competed at the 1980 Moscow Olympics:

- Round of 16: Defeated Bozhidar Ivanov (Bulgaria) by decision, 5–0
- Quarterfinal: Defeated Benny Pike (Australia) by a second-round knockout
- Semifinal Lost to Slobodan Kačar (Yugoslavia) referee stopped contest in the second round (was awarded a bronze medal)
