= Noè Cruciani =

Italian boxer (1963–1996)

Personal information
- Nationality: Italian
- Born: 26 January 1963 Foligno, Italy
- Died: 20 May 1996 (aged 33)

Sport
- Sport: Boxing
Medal record
Men's amateur boxing
Representing Italy
World Cup
Silver medal – second place	1983 Rome	Middleweight

Noè Cruciani (26 January 1963 – 20 May 1996) was an Italian boxer. He competed in the men's middleweight event at the 1984 Summer Olympics.
