= Tony Wilson (boxer) =

English boxer

Personal information
- Nationality: British
- Born: Anthony Everoll Wilson; 25 April 1964 (age 62) Wolverhampton, England
- Height: 5 ft 11 in (1.80 m)
- Weight: Light heavyweight

Boxing career

Boxing record
- Total fights: 29
- Wins: 20
- Win by KO: 16
- Losses: 8
- Draws: 1

Anthony Everoll Wilson (born 25 April 1964) is a British former professional boxer who competed from 1985 to 1993. He held the British light heavyweight title between 1987 and 1989. As an amateur, he represented the UK at the 1984 Summer Olympics.

== Career ==
Born in Wolverhampton in 1964, Wilson had a successful career as an amateur, winning two ABA titles and representing the UK at the 1984 Summer Olympics, where he reached the quarter-finals.

Wilson started his professional career in February 1985, working with trainer Jimmy Tibbs and promoter Frank Warren, with a fourth round stoppage of Blaine Logsdon at the Royal Albert Hall. He won all nine of his fights in 1985 and 1986 including a sixth round stoppage of Simon Harris, whose jaw was broken by Wilson. His first fight of 1987 was a final eliminator for the British light heavyweight title against Keith Bristol, which resulted in Wilson stopping him in the first round. He suffered his first defeat in May when he was stopped in the second round by American Jesse Shelby.

In December 1987, he once again met Logsdon for the vacant British title. After six rounds, the fight was stopped due to cuts over Logsdon's eye. Wilson made his first defence in May 1988 against Brian Schumacher. Wilson was knocked down in the first round but recovered to stop Schumacher in the sixth. He made a second defence against Schumacher in January 1989, this time winning in three rounds to take the Lonsdale Belt outright. His third defence came two months later against Tom Collins. Collins stopped Wilson in the second round to take the title — only Wilson's second defeat.

He beat Steve McCarthy in controversial circumstances in September 1989. McCarthy knocked Wilson down in the third round. Looking to finish the fight with Wilson on the ropes, the fight was stopped when Wilson's 62-year-old mother climbed into the ring and started attacking McCarthy with her shoe; Wilson's corner man also entered the ring. McCarthy believed he had won and left the ring, but bizarrely referee Adrian Morgan insisted that the fight should continue. McCarthy refused (the injury caused by Wilson's mother required four stitches) and Wilson was declared the winner by technical knockout. A riot ensued and Wilson's mother had to be dragged from the ring by her hair by a security guard; McCarthy returned to the ring but only to calm the crowd. A BBBofC enquiry upheld the result but ordered a rematch, but McCarthy pulled out, suffering from flu.

He travelled to the United States in 1990 where he beat Steve Harvey and lost to James Flowers. It was a year before his next fight, and while he continued until 1993, he won only one of his last eight fights.

Now retired, Wilson runs a boxing gym in Walsall and coaches boxers.
