= Drake Thadzi =

Malawian boxer

Drake Thadzi (born November 23, 1964, in Lilongwe) is a Malawian former professional boxer who competed from 1984 to 1998, twice challenging for a light heavyweight world title in 1995 and 1998. As am amateur, he competed at the 1984 Summer Olympics in Los Angeles.

== Amateur career ==
Thadzi represented Malawi at the 1984 Olympics; he was decisioned in the second round of competition in the light heavyweight division (– 81 kg) by Algeria's eventual bronze medalist Mustapha Moussa.

== Professional career ==
Soon afterwards Thadzi turned professional. He challenged Virgil Hill for the WBA light heavyweight world title in 1995 but lost a decision.

Thadzi scored his career best win in 1997, when he upset three-time world champion James Toney via majority decision at the Foxwoods Casino. At that point Thadzi appeared primed to fight for a title but manager Goody Petronelli inexplicably failed to get him a fight during the next 15 months. Thadzi finished his career with only two more fights after the Toney win. He scored a technical knockout victory over "Iceman" John Scully and lost a WBO light heavyweight world match to Dariusz Michalczewski, before retiring in 1998 with a record of 30 wins, 9 losses, 1 draw, with 25 of his wins coming by knockout.

== Professional boxing record ==
30 Wins (25 KOs), 9 Losses (4 KOs), 1 Draw
Result	Record	Opponent	Type	Round	Date	Location	Notes
Loss	38-0	(Poland) Dariusz Michalczewski	TKO	9	12/12/1998	Frankfurt, Germany	For Lineal/WBO light-heavyweight world titles.
Win	37-8	(United States) Iceman John Scully	TKO	7	02/08/1998	(United States) Boston, Massachusetts, U.S.	
Win	54-3-2	(United States) James Toney	MD	12	14/05/1997	(United States) Mashantucket, Connecticut, U.S.	
Win	11-7-1	(Canada) Darrell Flint	TKO	9	19/10/1996	Halifax, Nova Scotia, Canada	
Loss	40-1	(United States) Virgil Hill	UD	12	02/09/1995	(United Kingdom) Wembley, London, England	For WBA light-heavyweight world title.
Win	9-24-1	(United States) Jose Hiram Torres	KO	2	19/05/1995	(United States) New Bedford, Massachusetts, U.S.	
Win	5-14	(United States) Joe Harris	KO	2	04/03/1995	(United States) Boston, Massachusetts, U.S.	
Win	13-13	(United States) Willie Kemp	PTS	8	01/10/1994	(United States) Boston, Massachusetts, U.S.	
Win	3-3	(Hungary) Zoltan Fuzesy	TKO	3	04/06/1994	Dortmund, Germany	
Loss	16-0-1	(United States) Ernest Mateen	MD	10	13/05/1993	(United States) Atlantic City, New Jersey, U.S.	
Loss	18-1-1	(United States) Adolpho Washington	UD	10	16/01/1993	(United States) San Antonio, Texas, U.S.	
Win	7-19	(United States) Jose Vera	PTS	8	08/05/1992	(United States) Taunton, Massachusetts, U.S.	
Loss	7-4	(United States) Art Bayliss	KO	8	28/02/1992	(United States) Boston, Massachusetts, U.S.	
Win	15-22	(United States) Danny Chapman	TKO	3	12/12/1991	(United States) Taunton, Massachusetts, U.S.	
Win	6-24-4	(United States) Jimmy Harrison	TKO	5	23/08/1991	(United States) Boston, Massachusetts, U.S.	New England light-heavyweight title.
Win	11-5-2	(United States) Danny Stonewalker	TKO	8	04/08/1991	Moncton, New Brunswick, Canada	Canada light-heavyweight title.
Win	19-27	(United States) Robert Curry	TKO	3	31/05/1991	Shediac, New Brunswick, Canada	
Loss	27-6	(Trinidad and Tobago) Leslie Stewart	UD	10	28/02/1991	Halifax, Nova Scotia, Canada	
Win	7-11-1	(United States) Melvin Ricks	KO	6	14/09/1990	Shediac, New Brunswick, Canada	
Win	6-9-1	(Jamaica) Wesley Reid	KO	3	22/06/1990	(United States) Taunton, Massachusetts, U.S.	New England light-heavyweight title.
Win	0-7-2	(United States) Ruben Cardona	KO	5	23/02/1990	(United States) Lowell, Massachusetts, U.S.	
Loss	5-8-1	(United States) Wesley Reid	KO	4	19/01/1990	(United States) Taunton, Massachusetts, U.S.	New England light-heavyweight title.
Win	22-11	(United Kingdom) Keith Bristol	UD	6	20/10/1989	(United States) Taunton, Massachusetts, U.S.	
Loss	5-0	(United States) Al Cole	PTS	6	12/09/1989	(United States) Atlantic City, New Jersey, U.S.	
Win	22-10	(United Kingdom) Keith Bristol	KO	5	09/06/1989	(United States) Taunton, Massachusetts, U.S.	
Win	--	(United States) Rodney Jones	TKO	1	28/04/1989	(United States) Taunton, Massachusetts, U.S.	
Win	10-2	(Canada) Terry Francis	KO	5	30/03/1989	Moncton, New Brunswick, Canada	
Win	--	(United States) Dennis Burley	TKO	2	10/12/1988	(United States) Salem, New Hampshire, U.S.	
Win	0-1	(United States) Angel Colon	TKO	1	22/10/1988	(United States) Salem, New Hampshire, U.S.	
Win	2-5	(United States) Andy Gordon	TKO	2	30/07/1988	(United States) Brockton, Massachusetts, U.S.	
Loss	11-1	(Ghana) Sadik Sulemana	TKO	4	24/11/1987	Halifax, Nova Scotia, Canada	
Draw	3-2	(Canada) Darrell Flint	PTS	6	29/09/1987	Halifax, Nova Scotia, Canada	
Win	0-1	(Canada) Ken Barlow	TKO	3	20/09/1987	Shediac, New Brunswick, Canada	
Win	--	(Canada) Ken Barlow	TKO	2	07/07/1987	Halifax, Nova Scotia, Canada	
Win	1-2	(Zimbabwe) Gilbert Mwambo	KO	8	09/03/1986	Lilongwe, Malawi	
Win	--	Ben Chitenje	KO	3	09/02/1986	Malawi	
Win	--	(Zambia) Joseph Poto	KO	5	02/11/1985	Malawi	
Win	0-1	Justice Mahilasi	PTS	6	29/06/1985	Malawi	
Win	--	Titus Kanyanji	KO	3	24/02/1985	Malawi	
Win	--	Justice Mahilasi	KO	2	28/12/1984	Malawi	
