= Paulo Tuvale =

Samoan boxer

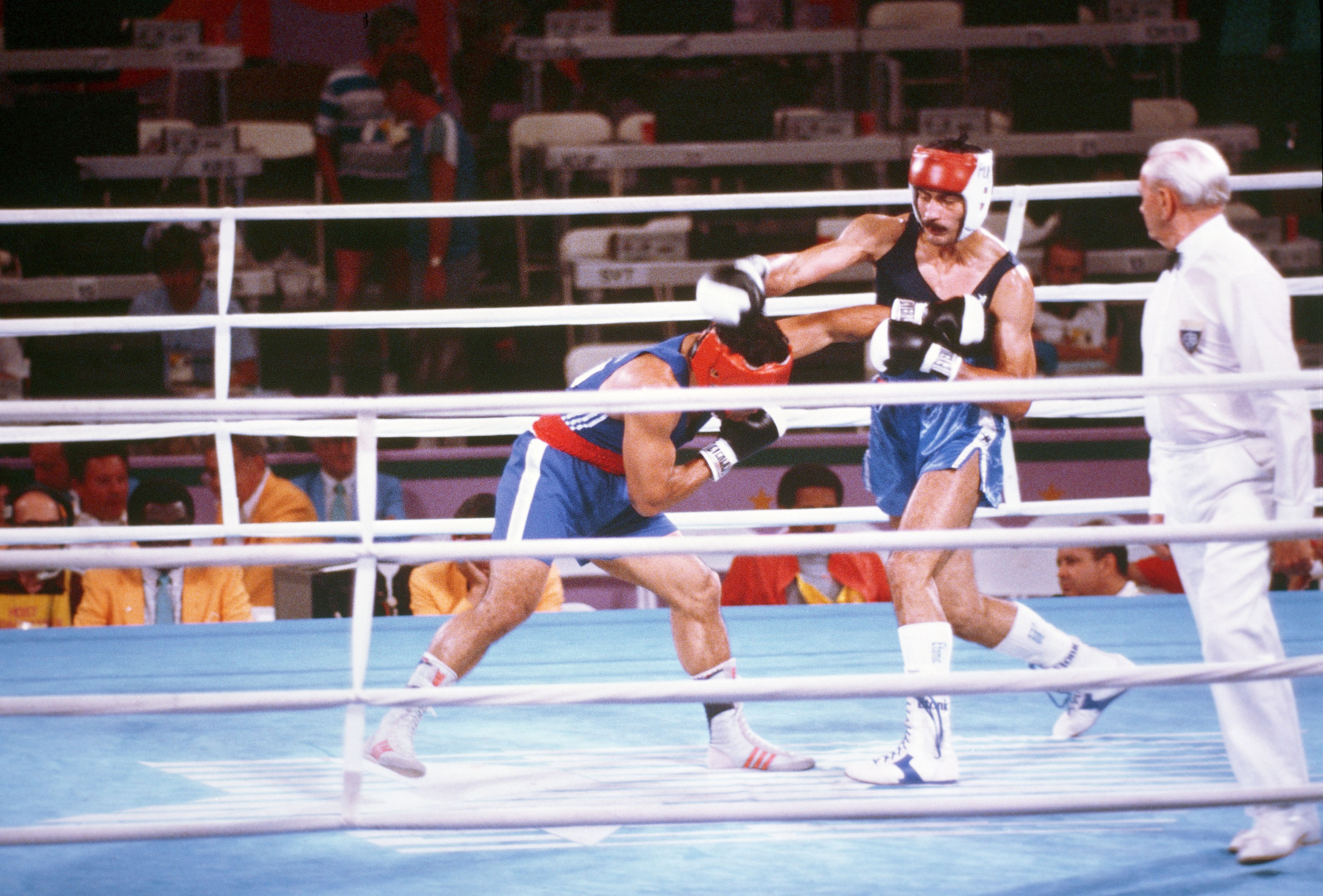
- Tuvale (left) versus Aristides Gonzalez of Puerto Rico at the 1984 Olympics

Personal information
- Nationality: Samoan
- Born: 22 January 1954 (age 71)

Sport
- Sport: Boxing

Paulo Tuvale (born 22 January 1954) is a Samoan boxer. He competed in the men's middleweight event at the 1984 Summer Olympics.
