= Tanya Moss =

Former New Zealand rhythmic gymnast

- Born: 12 February 1964 (age 62); Auckland, New Zealand
- Notable work: Rhythmic Gymnastics
- Spouse: Kevin Barry
- Children: Jordyn, Mitchell, Taylor

Tania (Tanya) Roxanne Moss (born 12 February 1964 in Auckland) is a New Zealand former gymnast who competed in the 1984 Olympic Games in Los Angeles. She performed in rhythmic gymnastics. She is a multi-time New Zealand and Australasian Champion. In 1983 she was ranked #2 in the Commonwealth. She also won the New Zealand Gymnast of the year 6 times. On her retirement from competitive gymnastics she went on to coach one of the top clubs in the country and had many national champions and national representatives from her club, Xtreme Rhythmix. Tanya travelled extensively for New Zealand either as a coach or judge for various national teams.

== Personal life ==
She is married to another New Zealand Olympian, a silver-medalist in the light-heavyweight boxing division, Kevin Barry. They met at the 1984 Olympic Games. They first resided in Auckland, where they moved soon after their wedding. They currently reside in Las Vegas, Nevada, after leaving New Zealand. Tanya works as a gymnastics and dance coach at pre-Olympic training centers.

Moss had three children with Barry, Jordy (Daughter) and Mitchell & Taylor (twin sons). Mitchell and Taylor both played American Football for their high school and Nevada Spartans, but Taylor turned his attention to full time training alongside Kevin. Moss now resides with the boxers that Kevin and Taylor train, including WBO World Heavyweight Champion Joseph Parker, IBO World Light Heavyweight Champion Umar Salamov and Polish heavyweight boxer Izu Ugonoh. Moss does not care for the sport of boxing herself.
