= Patrick Lihanda =

Ugandan boxer (born 1962)

Personal information
- Nationality: Ugandan
- Born: 11 April 1962 (age 63)

Sport
- Sport: Boxing

Patrick Lihanda (born 11 April 1962) is a Ugandan boxer. He competed at the 1984 Summer Olympics and the 1988 Summer Olympics.
