= Rick Duff =

Canadian boxer

Rick Duff (born June 21, 1964) is a retired boxer from Canada, who competed for his country as a middleweight (– 75 kg) at the 1984 Summer Olympics in Los Angeles, California. He defeated the Australian Brendon Cannon in the first round, but was defeated in the second round of the men's division by South Korea's eventual gold medalist Shin Joon-Sup.

== 1984 Canadian Olympic box-offs ==
The box-offs took place during the 1984 Canadian National Junior Boxing Championships at the British Columbia Amateur Boxing Training Centre in Burnaby, BC, May 25 to 27, where Duff defeated Darrell Flint, and won a spot on the Canadian Olympic Boxing Team.

Duff is currently coaching amateur boxing in Lethbridge, Alberta.
