= Jerry Okorodudu =

Nigerian boxer (1959–2023)

Personal information
- Full name: Jeremiah Okorodudu-Okoro
- Nationality: Nigerian
- Born: 24 May 1959
- Died: 28 June 2023 (aged 64) Lagos, Nigeria

Sport
- Sport: Boxing

Jeremiah Okorodudu-Okoro (24 May 1959 – 28 June 2023) was a Nigerian boxer. He competed in the men's middleweight event at the 1984 Summer Olympics.

Jerry Okorodudu died from complications from a foot ulcer in Lagos, on 28 June 2023, at the age of 64.
