= Jean-Paul Nanga-Ntsah =

Cameroonian boxer (born 1955)

Personal information
- Nationality: Cameroonian
- Born: 23 May 1955 (age 69)

Sport
- Sport: Boxing

Jean-Paul Nanga-Ntsah (born 23 May 1955) is a Cameroonian boxer. He competed at the 1980 Summer Olympics and the 1984 Summer Olympics. At the 1980 Summer Olympics, he lost to Georgică Donici of Romania.
