= Georgică Donici =

Romanian boxer

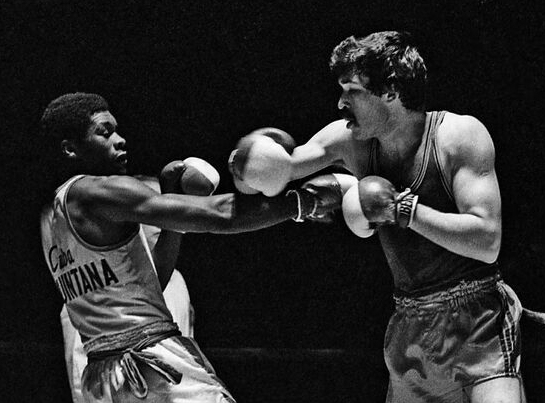
- Julio Quintana vs Georgică Donici (right) in 1983

Personal information
- Born: 27 April 1957 (age 69) Galaţi, Romania
- Height: 185 cm (6 ft 1 in)
- Weight: 81 kg (179 lb)

Sport
- Sport: Boxing

Georgică Donici (born 27 April 1957) is a retired Romanian amateur boxer. He competed in the light-heavyweight division at the 1980 and 1984 Olympics and was eliminated in quarterfinals on both occasions.
