= Arístides González =

Puerto Rican boxer (born 1961)

Ariestides González
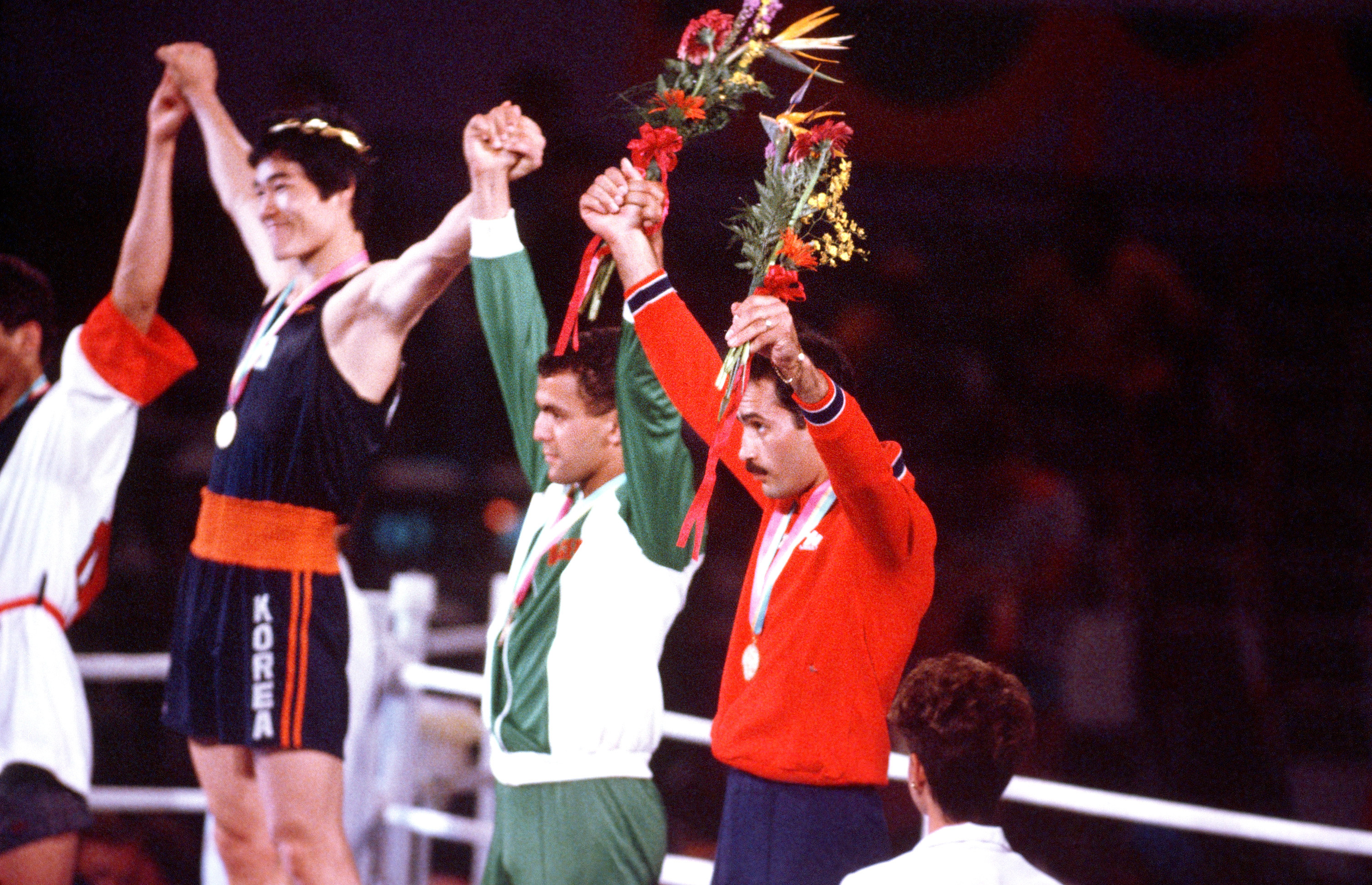
- González (in red) at the 1984 Olympics.

Personal information
- Full name: Ariestides González Ortíz
- Born: January 12, 1961 (age 65) Añasco, Puerto Rico
Medal record
Men's Boxing
Representing Puerto Rico
Olympic Games
Bronze medal – third place	1984 Los Angeles	Middleweight

Ariestides González Ortíz (born January 12, 1961) is a boxer from Puerto Rico, who won the bronze medal in the Middleweight division (71–75 kg) at the 1984 Summer Olympics in Los Angeles. He shared the podium with Algeria's Mohamed Zaoui. Although Juan Evangelista Venegas was the first Puerto Rican to win an olympic medal (boxing, 1948) González was the second to win a medal representing Puerto Rico under the Puerto Rican flag, after Orlando Maldonado became the first at the 1976 Summer Olympics.
