= Kasim Murungi =

Ugandan featherweight boxer

Kassim Murungi
Personal information
- Nationality: Ugandan
- Weight: Featherweight (57 kg)

Boxing career

Kassim Murungi is a Ugandan featherweight boxer who competes in the Uganda Boxing Champions League (UBCL). He fights out of the Eastcoast Boxing Club and is noted for his rivalry with Derrick Mubiru and for winning the Elite 57 kg belt at the 2023 UBCL season finale.

== Career ==
Murungi rose to prominence through his appearances in the Uganda Boxing Champions League. In September 2023, he fought Derrick Mubiru in a highly publicised UBCL featherweight matchup (Elite 57 kg), securing a narrow split decision.

Later that month, Murungi won a rematch against Mubiru by unanimous decision, consolidating his position as one of Uganda’s top featherweights.

In December 2023, Murungi won the Elite 57 kg belt at the UBCL Season II finale, defeating Jonathan Kyobe via a 4–1 split decision.

Murungi has also represented Uganda internationally, including at the Mandela Cup in South Africa.

== Style ==
Murungi fights in the featherweight (57 kg) division. Media reports highlight his disciplined ring control, counter-punching ability, and defensive improvements, particularly in his contests with Derrick Mubiru.

== Achievements ==
Year	Event	Result
2023	UBCL Elite 57 kg (Season II finale)	Champion (defeated Jonathan Kyobe)
2023	UBCL Week Six featherweight rematch	Winner by unanimous decision vs Derrick Mubiru

== Personal life ==
Murungi is a student at City High School in Kampala, where he balances academic work with his boxing career.

== See also ==
- Uganda Boxing Champions League
- Muzamir Semuddu
- Isaac Zebra Jr
- Uganda Boxing Federation
