= Rogers Semitala =

Ugandan boxer (born 1996)

Personal information
- Nationality: Ugandan
- Born: Rogers Semitala; August 31, 1996 (age 30)
- Height: 5 ft 4 in (163 cm)
- Weight: Flyweight / Bantamweight

Boxing career
- Stance: Orthodox

Boxing record
- Total fights: 10
- Wins: 10
- Win by KO: 9
- Losses: 0
- Draws: 0

Rogers Semitala (born 31 August 1996) is a Ugandan boxer who has competed in both amateur and professional boxing. He represented Uganda at the 2014 Commonwealth Games and the 2015 AIBA World Boxing Championships, before turning professional with an unbeaten record of 10 wins from 10 bouts, including 9 knockouts.

== Amateur career ==
Semitala boxed for COBAP Boxing Club in Uganda.

At the 2014 Commonwealth Games in Glasgow, he competed in the flyweight division (52 kg) but was eliminated in his opening bout against Sri Lanka’s Bandara Rathnayake by unanimous decision (3–0).

In 2015, he represented Uganda at the 2015 AIBA World Boxing Championships in Doha, Qatar, in the bantamweight (56 kg) category. He lost by unanimous decision (29–28, 30–27, 29–28) to Ecuador’s Bennet Segundo Padilla in the opening round.

At the 2015 AFBC African Confederation Boxing Championships in Casablanca, he reached the semifinals and earned a bronze medal.

His attempt to qualify for the 2016 Olympic Games was cut short during the national trials, when he was forced to retire with a right-hand injury in a bout against Atanus Mugerwa.

== Professional career ==
Semitala made his professional debut on 30 April 2016.

He went on to achieve an unbeaten record of 10 wins (9 by KO) and 0 losses.

Among his notable fights:

- Defeated Remmy Igga (2016, KO).
- Defeated Sunday Kiwale (2016, TKO).
- Defeated Bob Lee Nsubuga (2016, KO).
- Defeated Isaac Mugema (2017, KO).
- Defeated Alex Kaye (2017, KO).
- Defeated Samuel Baluku (2017, TKO).
- Defeated Roel Lazaro Perez (2018, TKO).
- Defeated DeWayne Wisdom (2018, UD).

== Style and stance ==
Semitala fights in an orthodox stance, with a reputation for power punching, reflected in his nine knockouts from ten professional victories.

== Personal life ==
Outside of boxing, Semitala has been open about his Christian faith. In 2020, during a period of inactivity, he suggested that he might shift focus to ministry work.

== Professional boxing record ==
10 fights	10 wins	0 losses
By knockout	9	0
By decision	1	0

Result	Record	Opponent	Type	Round, time	Date	Location
Win	10–0	DeWayne Wisdom	UD	6	28 Apr 2018	(United States)
Win	9–0	Roel Lazaro Perez	TKO	4	23 Feb 2018	(United States)
Win	8–0	Samuel Baluku	TKO	2	2017	(Uganda)
Win	7–0	Alex Kaye	KO	2	2017	(Uganda)
Win	6–0	Isaac Mugema	KO	3	2017	(Uganda)
Win	5–0	Bob Lee Nsubuga	KO	2	2016	(Uganda)
Win	4–0	Sunday Kiwale	TKO	1	2016	(Uganda)
Win	3–0	Remmy Igga	KO	1	2016	(Uganda)
Win	2–0	Isaac Mutesi	KO	2	2016	(Uganda)
Win	1–0	Jowali Kalenzi	KO	1	30 Apr 2016	(Uganda)

== See also ==
- Isaac Zebra Jr
- Ntege Musa
- John Sserunjogi
- Yusuf Babu
