= COBAP Boxing Club =

Boxing club

- Sport: Boxing
- League: Uganda Boxing Federation competitions
- Location: Mengo Uganda

COBAP Boxing Club is a Mengo (Kasubi)-based boxing club that trains youths in the boxing sport. The club has participated in a number of championships among which include: Uganda National Open Boxing Championship, Africa Boxing Championships, Nelson Mandela Boxing Cup, and National Juniors Championship among others. The club is regulated by national sports agencies like Uganda Boxing Federation and National Council of Sports. COBAP Boxing Club also obtained numerous victories at different championships like the Uganda National Open Boxing Championships emerging as winners at the 2024 competitions.

== Championships ==
In February 2021, COBAP Boxing Club won the Katende Memorial cup lightweight (60 kg) category. The club also participated in the 2024 National Novice Championships at the MTN Arena, Lugogo in their quest for honours. In 2010, at the National Novice Championships, COBAP Boxing Club emerged victorious in the competitions.

== See also ==
- Uganda Boxing Federation
- Zebra Boxing Club
- Uganda Bombers
- Uganda boxing Federation (UBF)
