= Yusuf Babu =

Ugandan professional boxer

Personal information
- Nickname: The Rolling Tiger
- Nationality: Ugandan
- Weight: Middleweight, Light heavyweight, Heavyweight

Boxing career
- Stance: Orthodox

Boxing record
- Wins: 2
- Losses: 0
- Draws: 0

Yusuf Hasanali Babu Abdulsamad is a Ugandan amateur and professional boxer and former captain of the Uganda national boxing team, he has competed in multiple weight classes including middleweight, light heavyweight and heavyweight.

== Amateur career ==
Babu trained at the COBAP Boxing Club in Kampala. During his amateur career he was a consistent performer across different divisions.

- He won gold medals at the Bingwa wa Mabingwa tournaments in 2016 and 2017.
- He represented Uganda at the 2017 African Boxing Championships in Brazzaville, losing a close quarter-final to Egypt’s Hosam Abdin.
- In 2019, he won the National Open Boxing Championship heavyweight title, defeating Emma Kyambadde.
- In January 2019, he was named Real Stars Sports Awards Best Boxer of the Month.

== Professional career ==
In September 2022, Babu signed a two-year contract with 12 Sports Rounds Promotions to launch his professional career.

- Debut: On 15 October 2022 at the MTN Arena, Lugogo, he defeated veteran Hudson Muhumuza by unanimous decision.
- Second fight: He later beat Tanzanian Alphonce "Mchumiatumbo" Masumbuko by unanimous decision, showcasing improved defense and pacing.

== Professional boxing record ==
Professional record summary
Result	Record	Opponent	Type	Round, time	Date	Location
Win	2–0	Alphonce "Mchumiatumbo" Masumbuko	UD	8	18 Dec 2022	MTN Arena, Lugogo, Kampala, Uganda
Win	1–0	Hudson Muhumuza	UD	6	15 Oct 2022	MTN Arena, Lugogo, Kampala, Uganda

== Personal life ==
Babu’s career has faced challenges outside the ring. He has survived violent incidents, including gunshot wounds, and has spoken publicly about periods of detention which disrupted his boxing progress. Lawrence Kalyango (Coach Lora) who happens to be his coach, has played a key role in rebuilding his form and discipline.

== Style ==
Babu is noted for combining speed with power in the heavyweight division, as well as improved defensive ability in his professional bouts. His charisma has also earned him popularity in Ugandan boxing circles.

== See also ==
- Ntege Musa
- Uganda Boxing Federation
- Shadir Musa Bwogi
- Isaac Zebra Jr
