= Muzamir Semuddu =

Ugandan boxer (born 2003)

Personal information
- Nickname: "Mr Take Over"
- Nationality: Ugandan
- Born: April 23, 2003 (age 23)
- Weight: Light-middleweight

Boxing career

Boxing record
- Total fights: 2
- Wins: 1
- Losses: 1
- Draws: 0
- No contests: 0

Muzamir Semuddu (born 23 April 2003) is a Ugandan boxer who has competed at national and international level. He captained the Uganda national boxing team at the 13th African Games in Accra, Ghana, where he reached the semifinals and won a bronze medal.

== Early life and domestic career ==
Semuddu was born in Uganda on 23 April 2003. He has competed in domestic competitions including the Uganda Boxing Champions League and for Kololo Boxing Club, where he featured in national fixtures and tournaments.

== International career ==
At the 13th African Games (Accra, March 2024) Semuddu competed in the light-middleweight (71 kg) division. He recorded a round-of-16 knockout of Togo's Holonou Akoussan and then defeated Ghana's Henry Malm to progress to the semifinals; his appearance in the semifinals secured a bronze medal for Uganda.

Semuddu was appointed captain of the Uganda Bombers for the tournament, a role noted in coverage leading up to the Games.

== Professional career ==
Semuddu has also fought in professional bouts. Databases list professional appearances in 2023–2024, with records available on BoxRec and Tapology.

== Style ==
Reports from domestic competition note Semuddu's aggressive style and capacity to finish fights inside the distance at national level, which contributed to his selection as captain for the Bombers at the African Games.

== Professional boxing record ==
No.	Result	Record	Opponent	Type	Round, time	Date	Location
2	Loss	1–1	Quincey Williams	TKO	1	24 August 2024	Philadelphia, United States
1	Win	1–0	Herbert Mugarura	TKO	3	1 May 2024	Kampala, Uganda

== Honours ==
- Bronze medal: 13th African Games (Accra, 2024) Light-middleweight (71 kg).

== See also ==
- Isaac Zebra Jr
- Uganda Boxing Federation
- Wasswa Amir Ssali
