= Wasswa Amir Ssali =

Ugandan boxer

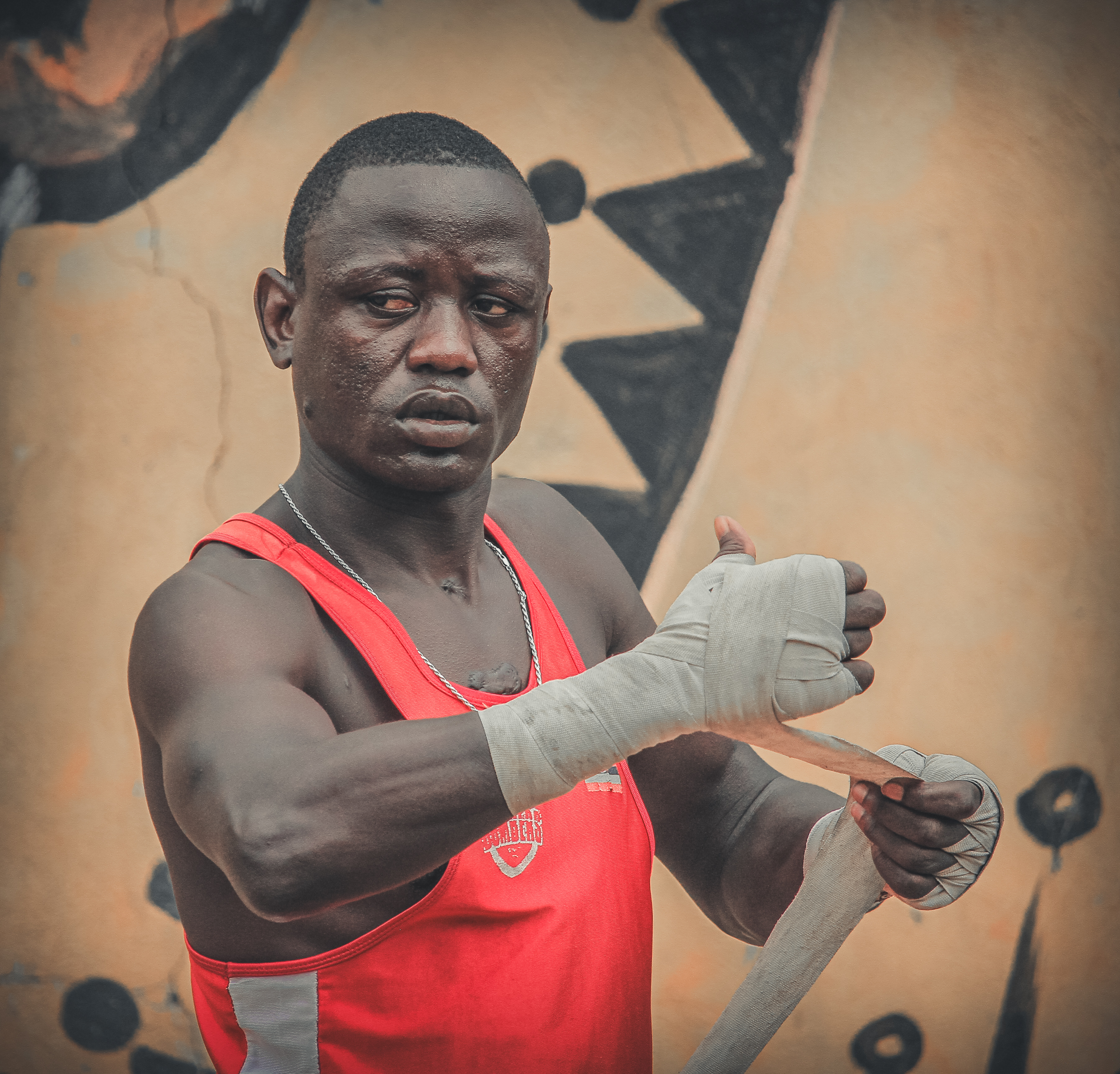

Personal information
- Nickname: The Animal
- Nationality: Ugandan
- Weight: Lightweight (57–60 kg)

Boxing career

Wasswa Amir Ssali is a Ugandan boxer who competes in the lightweight division. He represents Uganda on the national boxing team, the Uganda Bombers.

== Boxing career ==
Ssali rose to prominence at the 2023 Africa Boxing Championships in Yaoundé, Cameroon. Competing in the lightweight division, he reached the final after defeating Democratic Republic of Congo’s Idris Kitangila in the semi-finals.

In the final, Ssali lost to South Africa’s Sanele Sogwayi, securing a silver medal for Uganda. His silver medal came with a prize of US$10,000.

He later shared his achievement with youths in Kampala neighborhoods, highlighting his community ties.

== Notable matches ==
Selected bouts
Date	Event	Opponent	Stage	Result
3 August 2023	2023 Africa Boxing Championships, Yaoundé	Idris Kitangila (DRC)	Semi-final	Win
5 August 2023	2023 Africa Boxing Championships, Yaoundé	Sanele Sogwayi (South Africa)	Final	Loss (Silver medal)

== Awards and recognition ==
- Silver medal, lightweight division: 2023 Africa Boxing Championships (Yaoundé, Cameroon).
- Winner, "Boxing" category: Fortebet Real Stars Monthly Awards, August 2023.

== Personal life ==
Public information on Ssali’s early life and year of birth is limited. He is affiliated with Lukanga Boxing Club and has been nicknamed "The Animal" by local media.

== See also ==
- Uganda Bombers
- Uganda Boxing Federation
- Isaac Zebra Jr
