= John Sserunjogi =

Ugandan professional boxer

Personal information
- Nationality: Ugandan
- Weight: Super middleweight

Boxing career
- Stance: Orthodox

Boxing record
- Total fights: 17
- Wins: 15

John Sserunjogi is a Ugandan professional boxer who competes in the Super middleweight division. In December 2023, he became the first Ugandan to win the WBA Africa Super Middleweight title.

== Early life ==
Sserunjogi was born in Bussi Village, Kalangala Islands, Uganda, and grew up in Bweyogerere, where he discovered boxing.

== Professional career ==
Sserunjogi turned professional in November 2013, reportedly without any prior amateur experience. As of 2023, he has fought 17 professional bouts, winning 15.

In December 2023, he defeated his opponent in Conakry, Guinea, to claim the WBA Africa Super Middleweight title in the super middleweight division (76 kg), becoming the first Ugandan ever to achieve this milestone.

He has also participated in bouts under the African Boxing Union (ABU) and competed in events promoted by Nara Promotionz. Sserunjogi went on to win the Super middleweight title after defeated Egypt's Ahmed Boloshy.

== Significance ==
Sserunjogi is considered a breakthrough figure in Ugandan boxing, both for his rise as a professional without amateur experience and for securing a continental title that had never before been won by a Ugandan.

== See also ==
- Ntege Musa
- Isaac Zebra Jr
- Yusuf Babu
