= Zebra Mando =

Ugandan boxer (died 2020)

- Born: Isaac Ssenyange; Bwaise, Kawempe Division, Kampala, Uganda
- Died: 30 December 2020; St Francis Zone, Bwaise III Parish, Kawempe Division, Kampala, Uganda
- Occupations: Boxer; coach; boxing administrator
- Known for: Captain of the Uganda national boxing team ("the Bombers"); founder of Zebra Boxing Club

Zebra Mando (born Isaac Ssenyange, died 30 December 2020) was a Ugandan boxer, coach and sports administrator. He captained the Uganda national boxing team (the Bombers), founded the Zebra Boxing Club in Bwaise, Kampala, and was a prominent figure in grassroots boxing and youth development.

== Early life ==
Zebra Mando was born Isaac Ssenyange from Bwaise, Kawempe Division, Kampala, a neighbourhood he later served through his boxing club (Zebra Boxing Club) and community work.

== Boxing career ==
Ssenyange competed as an amateur for 15 years and became one of Uganda’s known boxers. He had an amateur record of 195 wins and 19 losses.

He served as captain of the Uganda national boxing team (the Bombers) and led the side at continental competitions including the 2011 All-Africa Games in Maputo, Mozambique.

== Zebra Boxing Club ==
Ssenyange founded Zebra Boxing Club in Bwaise with his wife, Mercy Mukankusi. The club became a grassroots training centre that recruited youths from low-income neighbourhoods and provided training, mentorship and life-skills programming as pathways out of poverty and crime.

== Death ==
On 30 December 2020, Zebra was shot dead in St Francis Zone, Bwaise III Parish, Kawempe Division, Kampala. Media accounts reported that he was shot outside his residence; the incident prompted national coverage, community mourning and calls for investigation into the killing.

== Honours ==
Ssenyange’s influence persists via Zebra Boxing Club and the boxers he mentored. His son, Isaac "Zebra Jr" Ssenyange, is an active boxer and promoter who has organised memorial events such as the "Mando Memorial Fight Night" and the monthly "Kampala Fight Nights" series.

Ssenyange has an amateur career record of 195 wins and 19 losses over about 15 years.

== See also ==
- Zebra Boxing Club
- Isaac Zebra Jr
- Uganda Boxing Federation
