= Uganda Boxing Champions League =

Uganda boxing league

- Sport: Boxing
- Founded: 2021
- First season: December 2021
- Organising body: Uganda Boxing Federation
- No. of teams: Multiple (Junior, Youth, Elite, Female divisions)
- Country: Uganda
- Venues: MTN Arena Lugogo; Club Obligato (Kampala)
- Sponsor: Sting Energy Drink (from 2022)

The Uganda Boxing Champions League (UBCL) is a national boxing competition in Uganda organised by the Uganda Boxing Federation (UBF). It was launched in December 2021 to provide regular competitive opportunities, professionalise amateur boxing, and enhance visibility of Ugandan boxing talent.

== History ==
The UBCL was initiated by UBF president Moses Muhangi in 2021. The league was intended to replace irregular boxing tournaments with structured seasons across all weight divisions.

In 2022, the competition secured a sponsorship deal worth UGX 285 million from Sting Energy Drink. From the 2023 season, championship belts replaced medals for category winners.

== Format ==
The league features Junior, Youth, Elite, and Female divisions. Bout lengths vary: three rounds for Juniors, four for Youth, and five for Elite fighters.

Seasons typically run throughout the year, culminating in a grand finale in December at venues such as MTN Arena Lugogo or Club Obligato in Kampala.

== Awards ==
- From 2023, category winners receive championship belts, each valued at about US$1,000.
- Athletes also earn allowances from gate collections and sponsorship contributions.

== Challenges ==
The Uganda Professional Boxing Commission (UPBC) has disputed UBF’s mandate to stage what it considers “semi-professional” bouts. Issues of officiating, judging, and crowd behaviour have also been reported.

== Seasons ==
| Season | Period | Venues | Notes |
|---|---|---|---|
| 2021–22 (Season I) | Dec 2021 – mid-2022 | MTN Arena Lugogo; Club Obligato | Inaugural season. |
| 2023 (Season II) | Apr – Dec 2023 | Kampala | Introduced belts for champions. |
| 2024 (Season III) | Jan – Dec 2024 | Kampala | Notable winners included Owen Kibira, Erina Namutebi, and Aziz Ringo. |
| 2025 (Season IV) | Aug 2025 – ongoing | Kampala | Opened with Nerrick Tumusiime’s first-round stoppage of Ashraf Mutaasa. |

== Champions ==
=== 2022 (Season I) Partial list ===
| Weight category | Winner |
|---|---|
| Junior 57 kg | Nabikolo Fatuma |
| Junior 70 kg | Onen Felix |
| Youth 51 kg | Shafik Mawanda |
| Youth 54 kg | Ibrahim "Kemis" Kemis |
| Elite 67 kg | Matovu Ukasha |

=== 2023 vs 2024 selected champions ===
| Weight category | 2023 Winner | 2024 Winner |
|---|---|---|
| Elite 71 kg | Muzamir Semuddu | Owen Kibira |
| Elite 57 kg | Kassim Murungi | Kassim Mulungi |
| Women’s 52 kg | | Erina Namutebi |
| Elite 54 kg | | Hussein Mulo |
| Welterweight | | Nuhu Batte |
| Heavyweight (92 kg) | | Aziz Ringo |

== Impact ==
The UBCL has been credited with providing regular competition, raising the profile of Ugandan boxing, and serving as a pathway for international representation. Media outlets have noted improved visibility for youth and female fighters.

== See also ==
- Uganda Boxing Federation
- Sport in Uganda
- Isaac Zebra Jr
- Muzamir Semuddu
