= Meddie "Kabona" Sebyala =

Personal information
- Nickname: Kabona
- Nationality: (Uganda) Ugandan
- Born: Muhammed Sebyala
- Weight: Middleweight

Boxing career
- Stance: Orthodox

Boxing record
- Total fights: 38
- Wins: 22
- Losses: 15
- Draws: 1

Muhammed Sebyala (also known as Meddie "Kabona" Sebyala or Kabona Meddie) is a Ugandan professional middleweight boxer. He is known as a veteran of the Ugandan boxing scene and a former Global Boxing Federation (GBF) Africa Middleweight Champion.

== Career ==
Sebyala turned professional in April 2007. By August 2024, he had fought in about 38 professional bouts, with a record of 22 wins, 15 losses and 1 draw.

In August 2022, he won the Global Boxing Federation (GBF) Africa Middleweight title by stopping Nelson Mangala of DR Congo in the third round at Club Obligato in Kampala.

In January 2024, he defeated Tanzanian opponent Majdi Ahmed Suleman by technical knockout.

On 10 August 2024, Sebyala fought Malawian Charles Misanjo in the main event at Club Obligato, promoted by Uganda Sports Promotions and Step by Step Promotions. He dominated the bout and secured a technical knockout in the second round.

== Style and reputation ==
Media describe Sebyala as a disciplined and durable boxer with a “no-nonsense approach” and strong physical fitness. He is noted for sharp jabs and body combinations, traits that contributed to his dominance against opponents such as Misanjo.

== Professional record summary ==
Fights	Wins	Losses	Draws
38	22	15	1

== Titles ==
- Global Boxing Federation (GBF) Africa Middleweight Champion (2022)

== See also ==
- Isaac Zebra Jr
- Golola Moses
- Uganda Boxing Federation
