= Moses Muhangi =

Ugandan sports administrator and entreprenuer

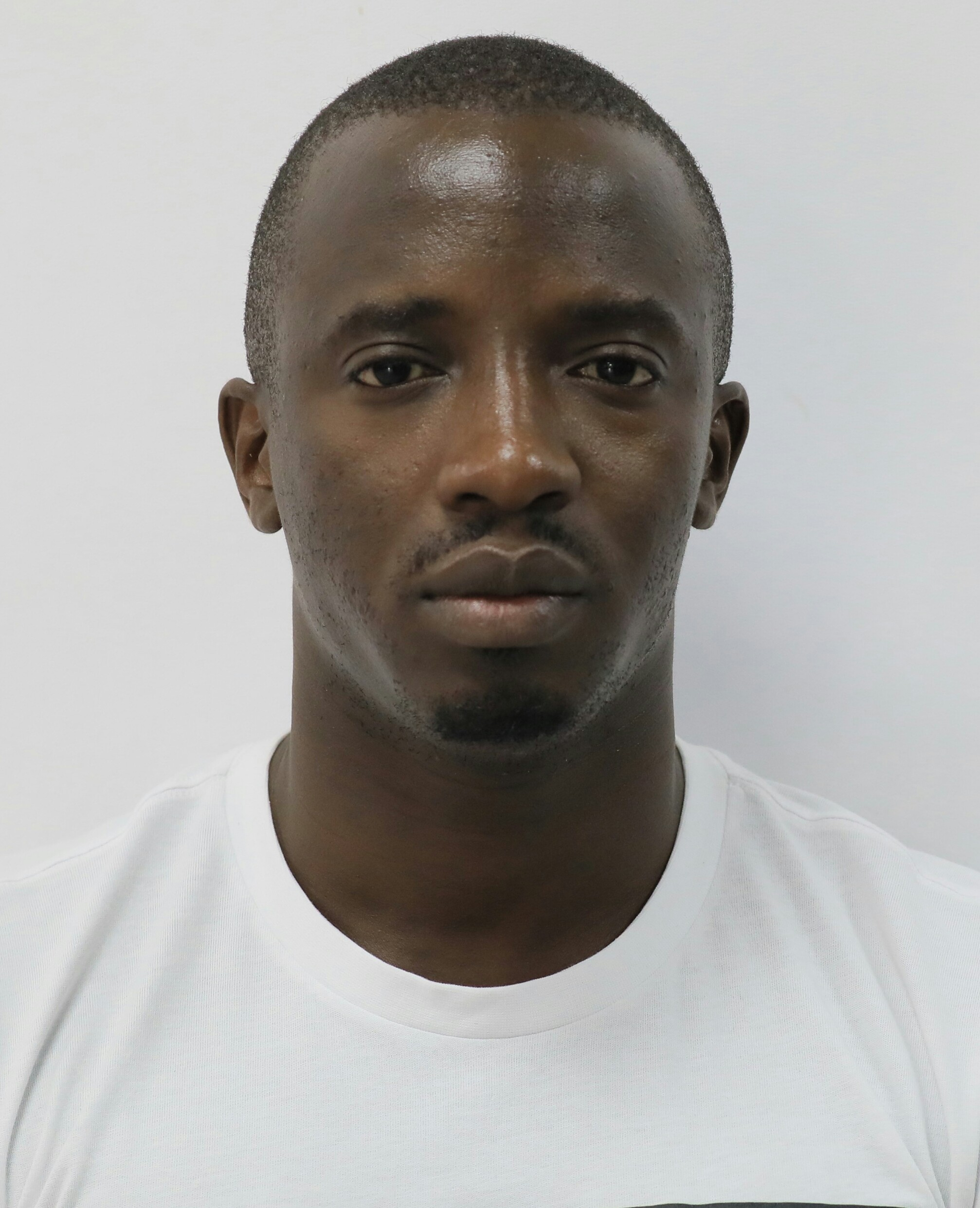

President of Uganda Boxing Federation
- Incumbent
- Assumed office April 12, 2018
- Preceded by: Kenneth Gimugu

Personal details
- Born: November 5, 1984 Mulago,Kampala
- Citizenship: Uganda
- Education: Makerere University (Bachelor's degree in Statistics), Uganda Christian University, (Bachelor's degree in Law)
- Occupation: Sports administrator, politician, businessman
- Profession: Lawyer
- Committees: Africa Boxing Confederation

Moses Muhangi (born 05 November 1984) is a Ugandan sports administrator and politician. He is the president of the Uganda Boxing Federation.

He is an member of both the International Boxing Association (AIBA) Marketing Commission and the AIBA National Federations Election Observers Commission since 2021.

He has been a member of both the International Boxing Association (AIBA) Marketing Commission and the AIBA National Federations Election Observers Commission since 2021.

== Early life and education ==
He was born on 5 November 1984, in Mulago Kampala.

He studied his primary education at Uganda Martyrs Primary School, Mbarara in 1997, for his O'level education at Kibuli Secondary School from 1998 to 2002, and A'level education at Kitante Hill School from 2003 to 2004.

He graduated from Makerere University with a Bachelor's degree in Statistics in 2005. He graduated from Uganda Christian University with a Bachelor's degree in Law in 2008. He earned a certificate in music production in 2009 while in Jamaica. He graduated with a certificate in law from the Law Development Centre in 2019.

== Career ==
=== Boxing career ===
Muhangi is a former amateur boxer who competed from 1999 to 2009. He served as patron of the Kibuli Mutajazi Boxing Club in 2012.

Muhangi was appointed as a committee member of the Africa Boxing Confederation. He holds an International Technical Officer for Boxing (ITO) certification issued by the International Boxing Federation.

=== Uganda Boxing Federation administration ===
Muhangi was declared president of the Uganda Boxing Federation on 20 January 2018 at Kati Kati Restaurant by Edmond Okiror, who was the returning officer for the election. Kenneth Gimugu was also announced as president in an election that was held at the Lugogo Sports Complex in a parallel elective assembly. His election was, however, refuted by the incumbent president, Kenneth Gimugu, who petitioned the High Court to nullify Muhangi's election. The High Court judge, Lady Justice Lydia Mugambe, ruled in favour of Moses Muhangi on 28 February 2018. Bosco Onyik, the chairman of the National Council of Sports (NCS), confirmed that Moses Muhangi was cleared to be president of the Uganda Boxing Federation for another four-year term.

Muhangi was re-elected unopposed as the Uganda Boxing Federation's president for a term running from 2026 to 2030 on 28 February 2026 by the UBF's elective congress, consisting of delegates from 90 districts, representatives from the National Council of Sports (NCS), and representatives from the Uganda Olympic Committee, which sat at Ibamba Restaurant in Kamwokya, Kampala.

=== Union of Uganda Sports Federations and Associations (UUSFA) ===
Muhangi served as the chairman for the Union of Uganda Sports Federations and Associations (UUSFA).

=== Policital career ===
Muhangi contested as an independent candidate in the 2026 Ugandan general elections for the Member of Parliament seat for Kampala Central, contesting against other politicians including Minsa Kabanda, David Lewis Rubongonya, Abraham Luzzi, and Muhammad Nsereko. He was nominated on 22 October 2025 for the Member of Parliament seat for Kampala Central, and he launched his campaign in Kamwokya.

Muhangi served as city councillor for Kampala Central in the Kampala Capital City Authority from 2006 to 2011.

=== Music production ===
Muhangi is the owner of Gong Records, a studio located in Ntinda. It has worked with musicians including Jose Chameleone, Sylver Kyagulanyi, Nina Rose, and Bobi Wine.

== Controversies ==
=== African Boxing Confederation (AFBC) presidential race ===
Muhangi received his nomination to participate in African Boxing Confederation (AFBC) presidential race from the Boxing Independent Integrity Unit (BIIU) Nomination Unit in 2023 but he later withdrew his candidature in favour of Berhanu Eyasu Wossen. In the 2022 African Boxing Confederation elections, Wossen withdrew his candidature from the race in favour of Muhangi, who came third with 9 out of the 40 votes. Bertrand Mendouga won by getting 21 of the 40 votes, while Ferhat Abdelnour-Fazil got 10 out of the 40 votes.

=== Remanded to Luzira prison ===
On 18 May 2023, Muhangi was remanded to Luzira Prison over forgery and falsification of accounts involving government funds allocated to the Uganda Boxing Federation. On 1 June 2023, he was granted bail by the Nakawa Court by Chief Magistrate Ritah Neumbe Kidasa. Muhangi denied the charges.
