= Jonah Kyobe =

Ugandan boxer

Personal information
- Nationality: Ugandan

Boxing career
- Weight class: Featherweight (57 kg)

Jonah Kyobe is a Ugandan boxer. He is a member of the Uganda national boxing team and competes in the featherweight division.

== Early life ==
Kyobe was born and raised in Kazo, Kawempe Division, in Kampala. He is the third child of his mother among five children. Kyobe dropped out of Bombo Army Secondary School in Senior One due to financial difficulties. As a teenager, he worked at the abattoir in Kalerwe to support himself. He also sells electronics and uses earnings from those and from his boxing career to support his family.

His boxing was encouraged by a mentor, Hamza Ssempewo, who taught him that the sport would give him “self-defense and a name.” His first recorded amateur fight was around 2012. At the 2018 National Intermediates tournament where he won the youth lightweight title.

== Boxing career ==
Kyobe represents Lukanga Boxing Club.

He earned a bronze medal at the 2022 Africa Boxing Championships held in Maputo, Mozambique, where he fought in the featherweight division and lost in the semifinals to Armando Roberto Sigauque of Mozambique. In 2023, he again earned a bronze medal at the Africa Boxing Championships (“AFBC”) in Maputo, receiving US$2,500 for his performance. Kyobe returned from sickness/injury to face Eliphaz Mbaziira in the Uganda Boxing Federation Champions League and won by unanimous decision.

== Style and recognition ==
Kyobe is known for his resilience and “inside-boxing” style. He has gained recognition for his perseverance in balancing work (including jobs at the abattoir) with training and competition. His nickname includes “Military Puncher.”

== Major bouts ==
Selected important matches
Year	Event	Opponent	Stage	Result	Notes
2022	Africa Boxing Championships, Maputo	Armando Roberto Sigauque (Mozambique)	Semifinal	Loss	Bronze medal earned
2023	Africa Boxing Championships, Maputo	(not specified)	Semifinal	Loss	Bronze medal; won bronze and prize money
2023	Uganda Boxing Champions League	Eliphaz Mbaziira	Regular season / Champions League Week 7	Win	Come-back fight after injury/sickness

== Personal life ==
Jonah Kyobe grew up in poverty and has spoken of working jobs (including at the abattoir) from a young age to support his family. He converted to Islam in childhood, adopting the name Farouk.
