= National Open Boxing Championship (Uganda) =

Amateur boxing in Uganda

- League: Amateur Boxing Championship
- Game: Boxing
- Founded: 2019
- Organising body: Uganda Boxing Federation
- Country: Uganda
- Most recent champion: Lukanga Boxing Club (2025)
- Most titles: Lukanga Boxing Club (2019, 2023, 2024, 2025)

The National Open Boxing Championship is the premier annual amateur boxing competition in Uganda, organized by the Uganda Boxing Federation (UBF). It brings together hundreds of boxers from across the country and is regarded as the primary pathway into the Uganda Boxing Champions League.

== History ==
The competition formerly started in 2019.

- In 2019, Lukanga Boxing Club became the first ever champions to win the National Open Boxing Championship, defeating East Coast and Police clubs.
- Lukanga has since dominated, winning the championship in 2023, 2024, and 2025.

== Organization and format ==
The championship is conducted under amateur boxing rules, overseen by the UBF. It features Elite, Youth, and Junior categories, for both men and women.

Over 500 boxers participated in 2025, representing more than 50 clubs across Uganda. Performance at the National Open determines qualification and retention for the Uganda Boxing Champions League.

== Significance ==
- Serves as a scouting ground for future national team members.
- Builds club rivalries between leading teams such as Lukanga, COBAP, UPDF, Kampala Boxing Club, and East Coast.
- Provides grassroots opportunities for young talent and promotes female participation.

== Recent editions ==
Year	Champion Club	Runner-up(s)	Notable Awards
2019	Lukanga BC	East Coast, Police	Maureen Ajambo (Best Elite Women), Teddy Nakimuli (Best Young Girl)
2023	Lukanga BC	UPDF, COBAP	Lukanga awarded motorcycle prize
2024	Lukanga BC	COBAP (2nd), UPDF (3rd)	Best Female: Nakinga Grace; Best Boxer: Mukuye Horod
2025	Lukanga BC	Multiple clubs contested	MVP: Ronald Nsamba

== Venue ==
The Lugogo Indoor Arena (Kampala) is the main venue, with matches held over several weeks.

== Governance ==
The event is organized by the Uganda Boxing Federation (UBF) under the leadership of its president, Moses Muhangi. Referees and judges follow international amateur boxing standards.

== See also ==
- Uganda Boxing Federation
- Uganda Boxing Champions League
- Sports in Uganda
- Amateur boxing
- Zebra Boxing Club
