= List of boxing organisations =

List of boxing organisations in chronological order by the year of their establishment. The four major sanctioning bodies are in bold.

== All list ==
Year Created	Location	Abbreviation	Organisation Name
1880	ENG	ABA	Amateur Boxing Association of England
1891	UK	BBBofC	British Boxing Board of Control
1903	FRA	FFB	French Boxing Federation (Fédération Française de Boxe)
1910	WAL	WABA	Welsh Amateur Boxing Association
1911	IRL (ROI & NI)	IABA	Irish Athletic Boxing Association
1911–1946	FRA	IBU	International Boxing Union
1915	AUS	ANBF	Australian National Boxing Federation
1916	ITA	FPI	Federazione Pugilistica Italiana
1920	ARG	ABF	Argentina Boxing Federation
1921	USA	WBA	**World Boxing Association**
1923	POL	PZB	Polish Boxing Federation
1931	JPN	JBA	Japan Pro Boxing Association
1946	SWI	AIBA	International Boxing Association
1946	FRA	EBU	European Boxing Union
1949	GER	BDB	Bund Deutscher Berufsboxer
1952	JPN	JBC	Japan Boxing Commission
1952	JPN	OPBF	Oriental and Pacific Boxing Federation
1954	GB	CBC	Commonwealth Boxing Council
1957	THA	PAT	Professional Boxing Association of Thailand
1963	MEX	WBC	**World Boxing Council**
1966	NZ	NZPBA	New Zealand Professional Boxing Association
1969	N/A	NABF	North American Boxing Federation
1972	BAN	BABF	Bangladesh Amateur Boxing Federation
1977	PHI	ABAP	Association of Boxing Alliances in the Philippines
1977	USA	USBA	United States Boxing Association
1980	IRL	BUI	Boxing Union of Ireland
1983	USA	IBF	**International Boxing Federation**
1984	USA	NBA	National Boxing Association
1988	LUX	WBF	World Boxing Federation
1988	PRI	WBO	**World Boxing Organization**
1989	USA	WPBF	World Professional Boxing Federation
1989	USA	IBC	International Boxing Council
1991	USA	IBA	International Boxing Association
1992	USA	IWBF	International Women's Boxing Federation
1993	USA	IBO	International Boxing Organization
1994	USA	GBU	Global Boxing Union
1995	USA	WBU	World Boxing Union
1995	USA	WIBF	Women's International Boxing Federation
1996	USA	IBU	International Boxing Union
1997	N/A	NABA	North American Boxing Association
1998	UK	PBA	Professional Boxing Association
N/A	USA	IFBA	International Female Boxers Association
1999	GER	GBC	Global Boxing Council
2000	USA	WIBA	Women's International Boxing Association
2002	N/A	WIBC	Women's International Boxing Council
2004	AUS	WBF	World Boxing Foundation
2004	GER	UBO	Universal Boxing Organization
2005–2007	N/A	TAB	Trans America Boxing
2008	N/A	WBF	World Boxing Forum
2010	N/A	IAB	International Association of Boxing International Amateur Boxing
2011	Brazil	ANIB	Associação Nacional E Internacional De Boxe
N/A	N/A	IAB	International Amateur Boxing
2012	USA	WBL	World Boxing League
N/A	N/A	UBF	Universal Boxing Federation
2014	USA	ABO	American Boxing Organization
2015	IND	IPBA	Indian Professional Boxing Association
2015	SWI	WBC	World Boxing Confederation
2016	N/A	BIBA	British & Irish Boxing Authority
N/A	KOR	WBS	World Boxing Society
2017	PAK	PBC	Pakistan Boxing Council
2017	USA	PBC	Professional Boxing Council
2017	LUX	RBO	Royal Boxing Organization
N/A	N/A	LBF	Legends Boxing Federation
2018	Brazil	IBFed	Intercontinental Boxing Federation
2018	USA	PBF	Pro Boxing Federation
N/A	N/A	APBC	Association of Professional Boxing Commissions
N/A	ITA	ITAB	Italian Authority of Boxing
N/A	EUR	EBL	European Boxing League
N/A	EUR	EBC	European Boxing Council
2019	TZA	WABA	World Alliance Boxing Association
2019	IRN	IPBA	Iran Professional Boxing Association
2023	SWI	WB	World Boxing

== Global (Worldwide) ==
#	Year Created	Location	Abbreviation	Organisation Name
1	1911–1946	FRA	IBU	International Boxing Union
2	1921	USA	WBA	**World Boxing Association**
3	1946	SWI	AIBA / IBA	International Boxing Association
4	1963	MEX	WBC	**World Boxing Council**
5	1983	USA	IBF	**International Boxing Federation**
6	1984	USA	NBA	National Boxing Association
7	1988	LUX	WBF	World Boxing Federation
8	1988	PRI	WBO	**World Boxing Organization**
9	1989	USA	WPBF	World Professional Boxing Federation
10	1989	USA	IBC	International Boxing Council
11	1992	USA	IWBF	International Women's Boxing Federation
12	1993	USA	IBO	International Boxing Organization
13	1994	USA	GBU	Global Boxing Union(GBU)
14	1995	USA	WBU	World Boxing Union
15	1995	USA	WIBF	Women's International Boxing Federation
16	1996	USA	IBA	International Boxing Association
17	1996	USA	IBU	International Boxing Union
18	1998	UK	PBA	Professional Boxing Association
19	N/A	USA	IFBA	International Female Boxers Association
20	1999	GER	GBC	Global Boxing Council
21	2000	USA	WIBA	Women's International Boxing Association
22	2002	N/A	WIBC	Women's International Boxing Council
23	2004	AUS	WBF	World Boxing Foundation
24	2004	GER	UBO	Universal Boxing Organization
25	2008	N/A	WBF	World Boxing Forum
26	2010	N/A	IAB	International Association of Boxing International Amateur Boxing
27	2011	Brazil	ANIB	Associação Nacional E Internacional De Boxe
28	N/A	N/A	IAB	International Amateur Boxing
29	2012	USA	WBL	World Boxing League
30	2012	USA	UBF	Universal Boxing Federation
31	2015	SWI	WBC	World Boxing Confederation
32	2015	DR	LBF	Legends Boxing Foundation
33	N/A	KOR	WBS	World Boxing Society
34	2017	USA	PBC	Professional Boxing Council
35	2017	LUX	RBO	Royal Boxing Organization
36	2017	PAK	PBC	Pakistan Boxing Council
37	2018	Brazil	IBFed	Intercontinental Boxing Federation
38	2018	USA	PBF	Pro Boxing Federation
39	2019	TZA	WABA	World Alliance Boxing Association
40	N/A	N/A	APBC	Association of Professional Boxing Commissions
41	2023	SWI	WB	World Boxing

== Continental ==
Year Created	Location	Abbreviation	Organization Name
1946	FRA	EBU	European Boxing Union
1952	JPN	OPBF	Oriental and Pacific Boxing Federation
1954	GB	CBC	Commonwealth Boxing Council
1969	N/A	NABF	North American Boxing Federation
1985	THA	ABCO	Asian Boxing Council
1997	N/A	NABA	North American Boxing Association
2005–2007	N/A	TAB	Trans America Boxing
2014	USA	ABO	American Boxing Organization
N/A	EUR	EBL	European Boxing League
N/A	EUR	EBC	European Boxing Council

- WBA Africa
- WBA Asia - 2014
- WBA Oceania
- Federación Latinoamericana de Comisiones de Boxeo Profesional (WBA Fedelatin)
- Federación Bolivariana de Boxeo (WBA Fedebol)
- Federación Centroamericana de Boxeo (WBA Fedecentro)
- Federación del Caribe de Boxeo (WBA Fedecaribe)
- North American Boxing Association (NABA) - 1997
- Pan Asian Boxing Association (1995–2018) / (2018–present)
- Eurasian Boxing Parliament - 2015
- African Boxing Union - 1973

== Major sanctioning bodies ==
=== Professional boxing ===
- World Boxing Association (WBA) (1921–present)
- World Boxing Council (WBC) (1963–present)
- International Boxing Federation (IBF) (1983–present)
- World Boxing Organization (WBO) (1988–present)

=== Amateur boxing ===
- International Boxing Union (IBU) (1911–1946)
- International Boxing Association (IBA) (1964–present)
- World Boxing (WB) (2023–present)

== See also ==
- Boxing
- Professional boxing
- Amateur boxing
- List of judo organizations
- List of kickboxing organizations
