= Universal Boxing Organization =

Professional boxing sanctioning organization established in 2004

- Abbreviation: UBO
- Formation: 2004
- Type: Professional boxing sanctioning organization
- Headquarters: Löhne, Germany
- Region served: Worldwide
- Vice President: David Maizner
- Website: www.uboboxing.com

The Universal Boxing Organization (UBO) is an international professional boxing sanctioning organization established in 2004 and based in Löhne, Germany. It awards championships at world, intercontinental, international and regional levels in men's and women's boxing.

The UBO is categorized among boxing's sanctioning organizations, operating separately from the "big four" professional championship bodies: the World Boxing Association (WBA), World Boxing Council (WBC), International Boxing Federation (IBF) and World Boxing Organization (WBO).

== Organization ==
The UBO recognizes world championships in professional boxing's weight divisions, alongside intercontinental, international, continental, regional and youth championships. Its title structure encompasses both male and female boxers.

In a 2020 survey of professional boxing sanctioning bodies, Boxing News identified Germany as the organization's headquarters.

== Championship history ==
=== World championships ===
Former WBO light-middleweight champion Bronco McKart captured the vacant UBO world middleweight title on 30 October 2010, defeating Michie Munoz by seventh-round technical knockout in Monroe, Michigan.

In January 2011, Uruguayan boxer Cecilia Comunales won the UBO women's world lightweight championship by knocking out Brazil's Halana Dos Santos in the sixth round at the Conrad Hotel in Punta del Este, Uruguay. The result was reported by the Uruguayan newspaper El País.

Swedish boxer Mikaela Laurén also held a UBO women's world championship. In March 2014, she retained her UBO title with a unanimous-decision victory over Esther Mashiya in Stockholm. The bout was covered by the Swedish public broadcaster Sveriges Radio.

Other former UBO world champions have included Yemeni boxer Ali Raymi and British bantamweight Prince Patel.

In Germany, heavyweight Werner Kreiskott successfully defended the UBO world heavyweight championship on 15 October 2017, defeating Georgia's Gogita Gorgiladze on points after twelve rounds in Wuppertal. The bout attracted approximately 1,500 spectators and was reported by the Wuppertaler Rundschau.

On 18 June 2022, Albanian boxer Sefer Seferi won the UBO world cruiserweight championship by knocking out Czech opponent Roman Kracik in the third round.

UBO world championship contests have also been held in South America. In June 2026, Chilean boxer Marcial Carrión defeated Argentina's Tomás Irusta to win the organization's world welterweight title in Iquique, Chile.

In July 2026, Peruvian boxer Eduardo "El Chino" Ajito defeated Mexico's Yudel Reyes by split decision at the Coliseo Fortunato Marotta in Callao, Peru, to capture the vacant UBO world flyweight championship.

=== International and regional championships ===
On 11 December 2010, Dhafir Smith defeated former IBF super-middleweight champion Jeff Lacy by unanimous decision in St. Petersburg, Florida, winning the vacant UBO super-middleweight international championship.

Former four-division world champion Roy Jones Jr. won the UBO Inter-Continental cruiserweight championship on 10 December 2011, defeating Max Alexander by unanimous decision at the Atlanta Civic Center. The Associated Press, in reporting the scheduled contest, identified the title as the organization's intercontinental championship.

Hong Kong boxer Rex Tso captured the UBO Asia-Pacific super-flyweight championship on 26 April 2012, stopping Thailand's Torsak Singabasak in the opening round. The victory was covered by the South China Morning Post, which reported that former world champion Ricky Hatton attended the event.

In August 2026, Guatemalan boxer Wyatt Trujillo won a UBO continental super-middleweight title after defeating Peru's Luis Miranda in Guatemala City. The championship was reported by Guatemalan broadcaster Emisoras Unidas.

== See also ==
- List of boxing organisations
- International Boxing Organization
- World Boxing Union
