= Minsa Kabanda =

Ugandan politician

Hajjat Minsa Kabanda
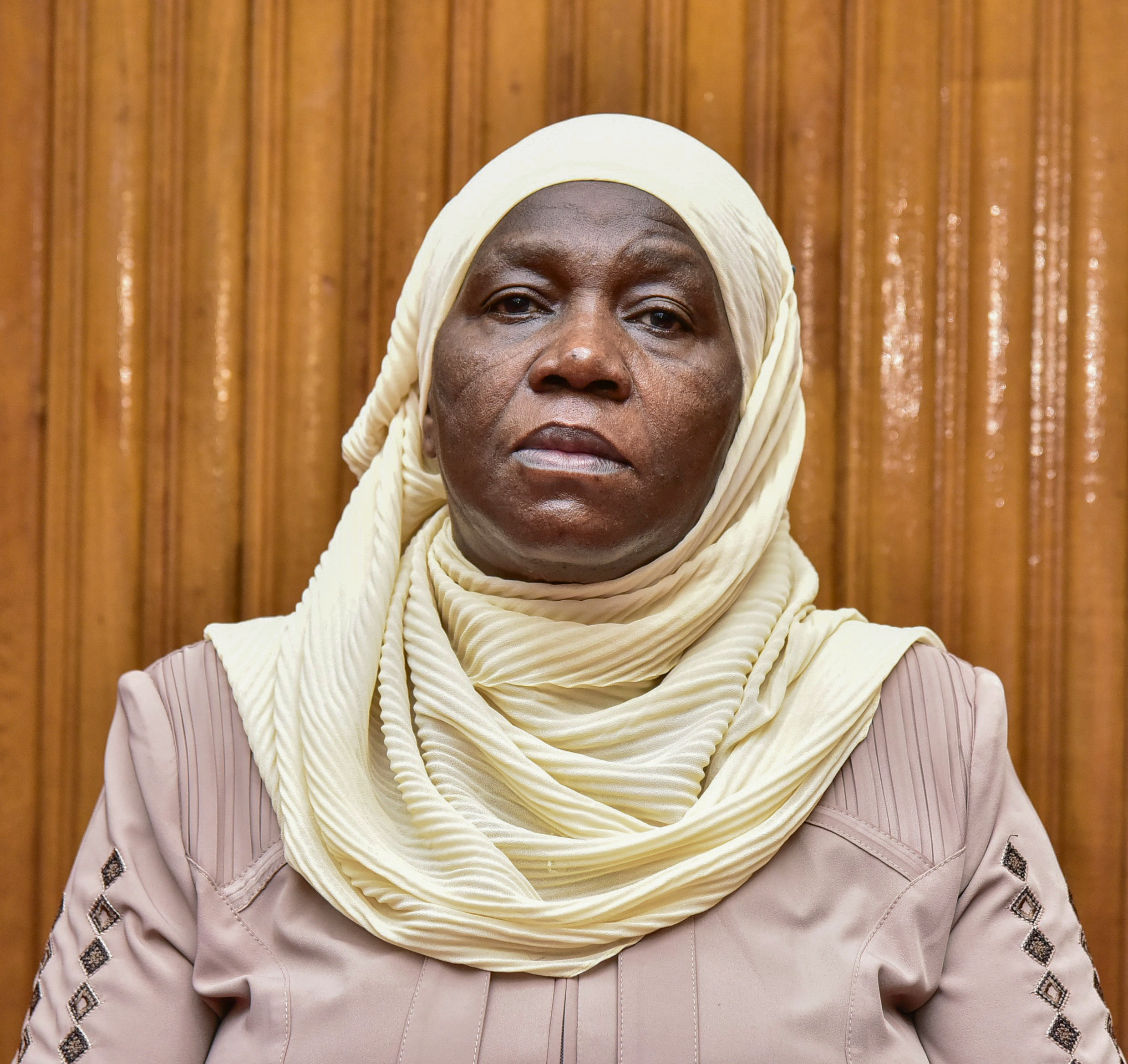

Minister for Kampala Capital City and Metropolitan Affairs
- Incumbent
- Assumed office June 2021
- President: Yoweri Museveni

Member of Parliament for Kampala Central
- Incumbent
- Assumed office 2026
- Preceded by: Muhammad Nsereko

Personal details
- Occupation: Politician

Minsa Kabanda, also known as Hajjat Minsa Kabanda, is a Ugandan politician who has served as the Minister for Kampala Central Division and Metropolitan Affairs since June 2021 to present. She is the elected Member of Parliament for Kampala Central in the 2026 general elections. She is a member of the National Resistance Movement (NRM) political party.

== Political career ==
As Minister for Kampala Capital City and Metropolitan Affairs, Minsa Kabanda leads the ministry responsible for coordinating metropolitan governance, infrastructure planning, local services and urban reforms in Kampala. In this role she works alongside officials such as Lord mayor, Deputy Lord Mayor and the heads of the city's five divisions.She was one of the ministers who finalized plans for the company to assemble and manufacture buses to ease transport needs in the greater Kampala Metropolitan Area (GKMA) through Kampala Capital City Authority and the METU bus industries. However, President Museveni rejected loans for importation of buses.

Kabanda represented Kisenyi slum in the Kampala Central Division Council and in 2016, she contested for the Kampala Central parliamentary seat on an NRM ticket, and lost to Muhammad Nsereko who had 25,746 votes compared to 12,380 votes she had garnered. In 2025, she was declared unopposed for the NRM party flag bearer for Kampala Central Division parliamentary seat after her opponents stepped down during party primaries.

=== Parliamentary career ===
In 2026 , the Ugandan general election, Kabanda contested the parliamentary seat for the Kampala Central constituency on the National Resistance Movement (NRM) ticket. She was declared the winner, defeating several candidates including National Unity Platform candidate David Rubongoya and Abraham Luzzi among others.

== Public engagement & initiatives ==
=== Youth and Skill Development ===
She has publicly supported skilling programs that aim to reduce crime by providing vocational skills to young people in Kampala, noting a positive impact on local communities.

=== Business and Entrepreneurship Support ===
Under her leadership with KCCA, she helped launch business hubs like in Makindye division to equip marginalised youths with entrepreneurial and career readiness skills, often in collaboration with partners such as Voluteer Services Overseas (VSO) and Standard Chartered Foundation. These hubs support training in ICT, career guidance and provide startup kits to beneficiaries.

== See also ==
- List of government ministries of Uganda
- Parliament of Uganda
- Cabinet of Uganda
- Dorothy Kisaka
