= WBA Africa =

Sanctioning organization for professional boxing bouts in Africa

World Boxing Association Africa
- Abbreviation: WBA Africa
- Type: Regional sanctioning body
- Headquarters: Various (Africa)
- Region served: Africa
- Parent organization: World Boxing Association
- Website: wbaboxing.com

WBA Africa is a regional arm of the World Boxing Association (WBA), one of the four major international sanctioning bodies in professional boxing. It sanctions regional championship bouts across the African continent and provides African boxers with a pathway to compete for international titles.

== History ==
The WBA was founded in 1921 as the National Boxing Association in the United States before becoming an international body in the 1960s. To strengthen its global presence, the WBA created regional branches including WBA Asia, WBA Oceania, and WBA Africa. WBA Africa was established in the early 2000s with the objective of promoting professional boxing across the continent.

== Activities ==
WBA Africa sanctions professional boxing matches in multiple weight classes. Champions crowned at the regional level earn ranking points toward WBA world title contention.

Key functions include:

- Sanctioning WBA Africa title fights across various divisions.
- Organizing professional events in countries such as Libya, Uganda, Tanzania, and South Africa.
- Showcasing African boxing talent at international level.

== Notable events ==
- In March 2024, WBA Africa sanctioned a major professional boxing event in Libya, marking the sport’s revival in the country. Former heavyweight champion Mike Tyson attended as a guest of honor.
- In December 2023, Ugandan boxer John Sserunjogi won the WBA Africa Super Middleweight title, becoming the first Ugandan fighter to achieve the feat.

== Significance ==
The WBA Africa titles serve as stepping stones for African fighters, raising their international profiles and increasing their chances of competing for world championships. The organization also contributes to the growth of boxing infrastructure and professional standards across Africa.

== See also ==
- List of boxing organisations
- World Boxing Association
- African Boxing Union
- World Boxing Council
- International Boxing Federation
- World Boxing Organization
- John Sserunjogi
