= Zebra Boxing Club =

Ugandan boxing club

- Full name: Zebra Boxing Club
- Nickname: Zebra BC
- Location: Bwaise - Kampala, Uganda
- Home ground: Zebra Boxing Gym, Bwaise
- Chairman: Isaac Zebra Ssenyange Jr
- Manager: Mercy Mukankusi; Moses Nyiro (head coach)

Zebra Boxing Club is a Ugandan professional boxing club and gym based in the Bwaise, Kawempe Division, Kampala, Uganda. Founded by the late Isaac "Zebra Mando" Ssenyange, the club is known for training amateur and professional boxers from underprivileged communities and for using boxing as a tool for youth empowerment and community development.

== History ==
Zebra Boxing Club was established by Isaac "Zebra Mando" Ssenyange, a former national boxer and captain of the Uganda national boxing team ("the Bombers"). The club developed a reputation for recruiting and training youths from Bwaise and other low-income neighbourhoods in Kampala, offering boxing training, mentorship and a pathway into organised competition.

On 30 December 2020, Isaac Ssenyange was shot dead in Bwaise; his death affected the club’s operations and left several development projects (including an academy building) unfinished. Leadership and day-to-day management were subsequently taken on by his widow, Mercy Mukankusi, and their son, Isaac Zebra Ssenyange Jr.

== Activities ==
Zebra Boxing Club offers training programmes for beginners, amateur and professional boxers, with particular emphasis on youth and women. Training is typically paired with mentorship and life-skills coaching intended to deter involvement in crime or drug abuse and to provide structured opportunities for young people in Bwaise.

The club also organises competitive events. Notably, the "Mando Memorial Fight Night" has been staged to honour the late founder and to raise funds for gym refurbishment and academy projects.

== Events and recent developments ==
In June 2024, Zebra Jr launched a monthly boxing showcase series, Kampala Fight Nights, aimed at providing regular fight exposure for local and regional boxers. The first event (1 June 2024) and subsequent shows featured domestic and international fighters and included the club’s own president, Isaac Zebra Jr, as a headline participant. Reports from those events note multiple non-title bouts and increased public interest in professional boxing shows in Kampala.

== Facilities ==
The club has faced long-running infrastructural challenges.

In mid-2024, the club received publicised support from Nigerian entrepreneur and musician Mr Eazi (via Chop Gaming Uganda), who pledged assistance towards refurbishment and equipment supply.

== Notable people ==
- Isaac "Zebra Mando" Ssenyange — founder; former national team captain and boxing administrator.
- Isaac Zebra Ssenyange Jr — son of the founder; professional boxer, promoter and club president; organiser of Kampala Fight Nights.
- Mercy Mukankusi — co-founder and coach; maintained involvement in training and operations after the founder’s death.

== Impact ==
Journalistic profiles have described Zebra Boxing Club as an important grassroots institution for boxing in Uganda, a "factory of dreams" that has nurtured aspiring boxers from impoverished neighbourhoods and contributed to the sport’s growth in Kampala.

== See also ==
- Uganda Boxing Federation
- Zebra Mando
- Isaac Zebra Jr
