= Abraham Luzzi =

Ugandan businessman and politician

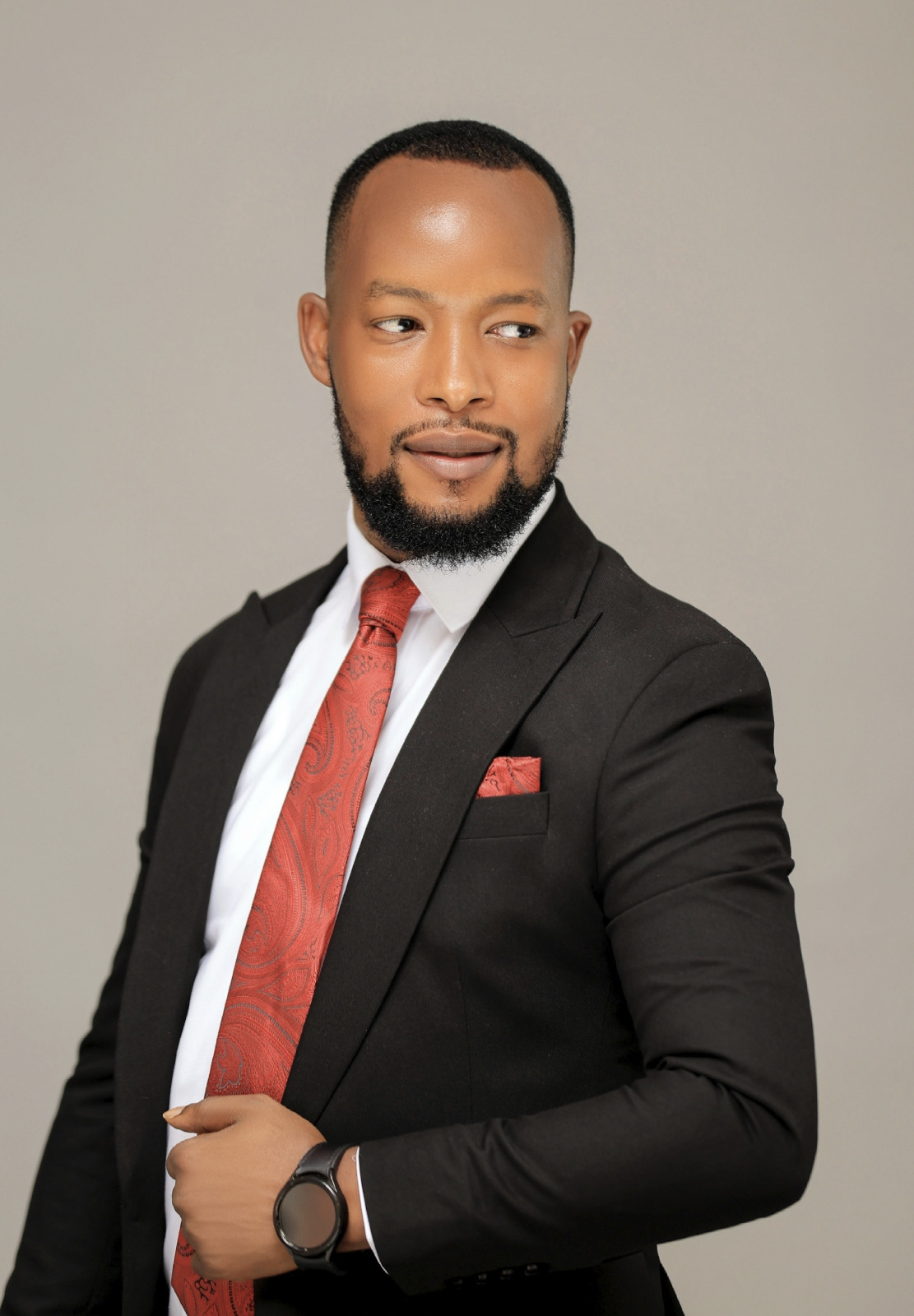
- Born: October 19, 1982 (age 44)
- Citizenship: Ugandan
- Education: SOS Hermann Gmeiner Schools Kakiri, Kawempe Muslim Secondary School, Lubiri Secondary School, Nkumba University
- Occupations: Businessman and politician
- Employer: Ssebo International Group of Companies
- Children: 5 including This is
- Parents: Hajj Badru Kafuuma; Hadijah Nantaba
- Awards: Presidential Award (2025)
- Website: Home Page

Abraham Luzzi, commonly known as Mr. Economy, is a Ugandan businessman, politician, author and sports enthusiast whose activities span mining, agro-processing, logistics, agriculture, and commercial services. He is the founder of Ssebo Food Industries Uganda Ltd and Ssebo Pure Gold and Jewelry Center, and oversees additional enterprises operating under Ssebo International Group in Africa, Europe, Asia, and the Middle East with a reported net worth of $170 million

Luzzi is the author of Reforms in Leadership: The 21st Century Mindset of Transformational Governance in Uganda and Africa, a book that examines leadership, governance, public accountability, and institutional reform in Uganda and Africa. He has also been involved in rotary, sports administration and youth development, including serving in management roles at Uganda Police Football Club and establishing a sports academy in London. In 2022, he received a ten-year ban from football-related activities by the FUFA Ethics and Disciplinary Committee, a decision he formally appealed.

Beyond business, Luzzi has participated in Ugandan party politics, first as a mobiliser for the National Resistance Movement (NRM) in Mityana and Mubende, later contesting for the Mityana Municipality parliamentary seat in 2021, and subsequently joining the Democratic Party before pursuing an independent political path. Ahead of the 2026 general elections, he emerged as an independent candidate for Member of Parliament for Kampala Central Division, gaining wide public attention for a campaign marked by frequent social media engagement, a personalised communication style, and policy proposals focused on anti-corruption, governance restructuring, economic reform, and urban administration.

His manifesto outlined measures such as reducing the size and cost of Parliament, expanding digital public-service systems, adjusting sentencing for minor offences, and introducing strict penalties for corruption, positions that have generated considerable public debate. His campaign slogan, "Sarah is tall," referencing his wife, Sarah Luzzi, became a recurring element of his political messaging and online presence.

== Early life and education ==
Abraham Luzzi is the son of Hajj Badru Kafuuma, a resident of Kakiri Luwunga in Busiro, Wakiso District, he is of Nsusu clan, and the late Hadijah Nantaba, who hailed from Kibanga Village in Bukandula, Gomba District from the lineage of the late Kalfane Gwayambadde of the Ffumbe clan.He grew up in Luwunga Kakiri

He went to SOS Hermann Gmeiner Schools in Kakiri for his Primary education, Kawempe Muslim Secondary School, Mityana Secondary School, and Lubiri Secondary School for his secondary education.

Luzzi studied Physics, Chemistry, Biology, and Mathematics at Advanced Level and later joined the Mulago Paramedical Schools to pursue Orthopedic Medicine. He later transferred to Nkumba University, where he obtained a Bachelor's Degree in Procurement and Logistics Management. He is currently pursuing a law degree at Victoria University Uganda.

== Career ==
Luzzi is a businessman whose investments cover various sectors, including gold trading and sand mining, stone quarrying, commercial agriculture, Experimental Medicinal canabis farming, processing and export, contract financing, forex, agro-processing, tourism, and travel. Additionally, he is engaged in logistics, clearing, and forwarding, among other activities.

He is the founder and director of Ssebo Food Industries Uganda Ltd, a company that specializes in large-scale agro-processing and the production of fortified foods, such as Ssebo Pure Maize Flour. Furthermore, he serves as the director of Ssebo Pure Gold and Jewelry Center, located at the Serena Hotel in Kampala. This jewelry center focuses on the trade and design of premium gold and jewelry products. Luzzi is involved in mechanized farming and agro-industrial development, emphasizing modern agricultural practices and the enhancement of the food value chain.

His enterprises operate in Uganda, the Democratic Republic of the Congo, and other countries such as South Africa, the United States of America, Canada, the United Kingdom, China, and the United Arab Emirates (Dubai).

He serves as chairman of Ssebo International Group, through which he also established a sports academy in Hammersmith, North West London, to support Ugandan youth aged 10 to 16.

In 2019, he was among the funders of the Ssingo Ssaza Team in the Airtel Masaza Football Championship. In 2021, he was appointed Marketing and Sales Manager of the Uganda Police Football Club and also served as Head of Public Relations. That same year, he wrote to the Federation of Uganda Football Associations (FUFA), requesting a review and amendment of the player transfer regulations.

In 2022, Luzzi was banned from participating in football-related activities at both national and international levels for ten years. Other officials banned alongside him included journalist David Isabirye and James Kaweesa. The FUFA Ethics and Disciplinary Committee found them guilty of match-fixing. Despite the ruling, Luzzi appealed, maintaining his innocence and alleging that the case was politically motivated.

=== Politics ===
Luzzi has also served as a mobilizer for the National Resistance Movement (NRM) in the Mityana and Mubende districts. During the 2021 elections, he contested for the Member of Parliament seat representing Mityana, Municipality under the NRM but lost to Bugembe John Mary in the party primaries. He later accused the NRM of election malpractice and joined the Democratic Party (DP) with the aim of unseating Hon. Francis Zaake of the National Unity Platform (NUP). However, during his DP campaign, he was later seen supporting the NRM presidential candidate.

==== 2026 general election ====
He ran as an independent candidate for the Member of Parliament seat seat representing Kampala Central Division. His political ideology involved reformism; he is an advocate for change from within the existing framework. His campaign slogan, "Sarah is tall," refers to his wife, Sarah Luzzi. Other candidates for the same position included NUP's flag bearer, Lewis Rubongoya, NRM's Hon. Minsa Kabanda, Suzan Kushaba, and Moses Muhangi. Kabanda won the election, and Luzzi pledged to work with her.

==== Post-election advocacy ====
Following the 2026 Ugandan general election, Luzzi continued to advocate for governance reform, public accountability, and institutional efficiency through public commentary and media engagements. His public commentary focused on issues including anti-corruption, judicial reform, digital government, and public sector administration.

== Public engagements ==
In July 2026, Nkumba University appointed Luzzi as its Honorary Ambassador, making him the institution's first official ambassador. According to the university, the role focuses on promoting alumni engagement, stakeholder relations, and the institution's public profile.

== Personal life ==
Luzzi is married to Sarah Luzzi. In 2026, the couple welcomed a daughter. During the birth of their child, Luzzi publicly advocated for confidence in Uganda's healthcare system by encouraging public leaders to utilise local health facilities whenever possible.

== Awards and recognition ==
In March 2025, President Yoweri Museveni presented Luzzi with a Presidential Award during a ceremony at State House, Entebbein recognition for his contributions to mineral development, agribusiness, and humanitarian service.
