= Ntege Musa =

Ugandan professional boxer

Musa Ntege
Personal information
- Nicknames: Hitman, Dinosaur
- Nationality: Ugandan
- Weight: Cruiserweight

Boxing career
- Stance: Orthodox

Boxing record
- Total fights: 16
- Wins: 9
- Win by KO: 7
- Losses: 7
- Draws: 0
- No contests: 0

Musa Ntege is a Ugandan professional boxer who competes in the cruiserweight division. He is best known for winning and defending the East & Central Africa Cruiserweight Title.

== Early life ==
Ntege comes from Nansana, Wakiso District, Uganda, and has combined boxing with work outside the sport, including employment in an abattoir.

== Professional career ==
=== Debut and rise ===
Ntege made his professional debut in 2015. By 2019 he had established himself as a strong regional contender, claiming the East & Central Africa Cruiserweight Title after defeating Tanzanian Paul Kamatha in Dar es Salaam.

=== Title defenses ===
He defended the title against Tanzanian Imani Kawaya in 2022, and later against Shaban Hamadi Jongo on 4 November 2022, winning by technical knockout in the sixth round.

=== Continental challenges ===
In March 2023, Ntege fought former IBO super middleweight champion Thomas Oosthuizen in South Africa for the vacant African Boxing Union Cruiserweight Title, but lost by first-round stoppage.

Later that year, he faced Syrian-German boxer Mohammed Bekdash in Abu Dhabi but was defeated by technical knockout after 1:38 of the first round. Ntege later denied claims that the fight had been "sold".

== Professional boxing record ==
Professional record summary
Result	Record	Opponent	Type	Rd., Time	Date	Location	Notes
Loss	9–7	Tamba Merlin	TKO	1 (~0:55)	Feb 2025	Dubai, United Arab Emirates	Non-title bout
Loss	9–6	Abdul Njego	—	2	Jun 2024	Kampala, (Uganda)	Non-title bout
Win	9–5	Sharifu Ngobi	TKO	1	28 Oct 2023	Kasana, (Uganda)	Non-title bout
Loss	8–5	Mohammed Bekdash	TKO	1 (1:38)	15 Sep 2023	Abu Dhabi, United Arab Emirates	Non-title bout
Loss	8–4	Solomon Adebayo	UD	8	27 May 2023	Lagos, (Nigeria)	Non-title bout
Loss	8–3	Thomas Oosthuizen	TKO	1 (~1:03)	5 Mar 2023	Hammanskraal, (South Africa)	For vacant ABU Cruiserweight title
Win	8–2	Shaban Hamadi Jongo	TKO	6 (10)	4 Nov 2022	Dar es Salaam, Tanzania	Defended East & Central Africa Cruiserweight title
Win	7–2	Imani Daudi Kawaya	KO	6	Apr 2022	Bombo, (Uganda)	Defended East & Central Africa Cruiserweight title
Win	6–2	Ignatius Onyango	PTS	—	Nov 2021	Kampala, (Uganda)	Non-title bout
Win	5–2	Musa Kazungu	TKO	—	Dec 2018	Kampala, (Uganda)	Non-title bout
Win	4–2	Saul Ivan Male	KO	—	May 2017	Kampala, (Uganda)	Non-title bout
Loss	3–2	Dig Vijay Singh	UD	—	Oct 2016	Kotkhai, (India)	Non-title bout
Win	3–1	Robert Ochung	TKO	—	Apr 2016	Kampala, (Uganda)	Non-title bout
Win	2–1	Joseph Sentongo	PTS	—	Jan 2016	Kampala, (Uganda)	Non-title bout
Loss	1–1	Bernard Adie	—	—	Nov 2015	Nairobi, (Kenya)	Non-title bout
Win	1–0	Ayub Wakisadha	KO	—	14 Jun 2015	Kampala, (Uganda)	Professional debut

== Titles ==
- East & Central Africa Cruiserweight Title (2019–2022)

== Personal life ==
Ntege fights under Nara Promotionz and has been open about the challenges of sustaining a boxing career in Uganda.

== See also ==
- Isaac Zebra Jr
- Uganda Boxing Federation
- Yusuf Babu
