= Muhammad Nsereko =

Ugandan lawyer, politician

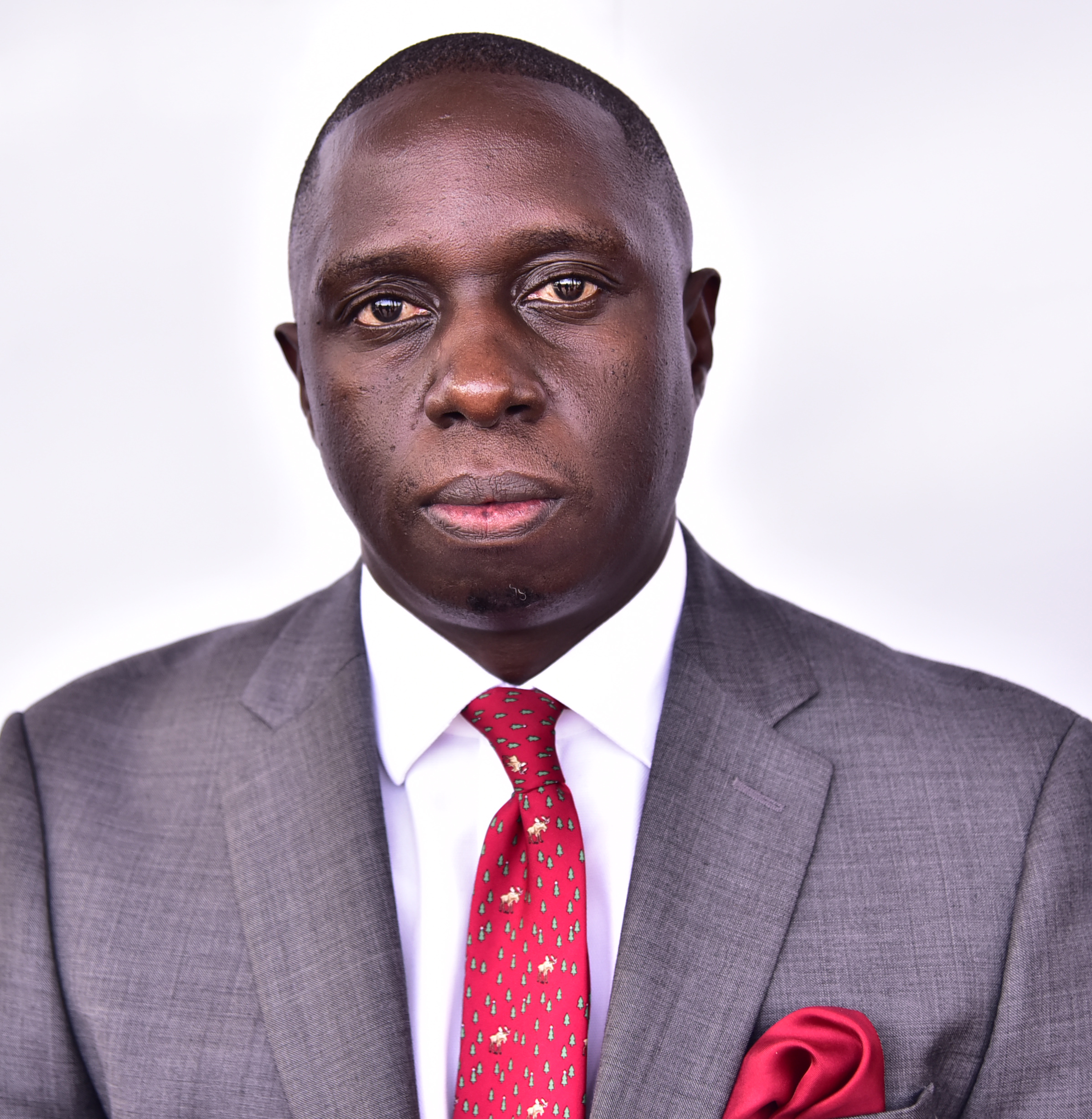
- Muhammad Nsereko in 2016
- Born: 25 April 1981 (age 45); Kampala, Uganda
- Citizenship: Uganda
- Education: Makerere University (Bachelor of laws ); Law Development Centre (Diploma in Legal practice); International Institute of Business and Management Studies (Diploma in Journalism)
- Occupations: Lawyer, politician
- Years active: 2005–present
- Known for: Politics
- Title: Independent Member of the Parliament of Uganda
- Predecessor: Erias Lukwago
- Other political affiliations: National Resistance Movement

Muhammad Nsereko (born 25 August 1981) is a Ugandan politician and lawyer. He is the president of the Ecological Party of Uganda(EPU) and a former Independent member of parliament, who represented Kampala Central Division constituency since 2011.

== Early life and education ==
Muhammad Nsereko was born on 25 August 1981. He attended "Buganda Road Primary School" for his elementary education, graduating in 1995. He then transferred to Kibuli Secondary School, for his middle school education, graduating in 1999. For his high school education, he studied at "Kawempe Muslim Secondary School", graduating in 2002.

In 2005, he graduated with a Diploma in Journalism, from the "Indian Institute of Business and Management Studies" (IIBMS). The following year, he graduated from Makerere University, with a Bachelor of Laws. In 2007, he was awarded the Diploma in Legal Practice, by the Law Development Centre.

== Career ==
Nsereko is a professional and registered lawyer and a member of the Uganda Bar. He has worked as a partner in the law firm of "Nsereko, Mukalazi and Company Advocates", since 2007. He also served as the chairman of the Kampala Central Land Committee, from 2006 until 2010.

== Political career ==
In 2011, Nsereko contested the Kampala Central Division constituency on the ruling National Resistance Movement (NRM) political party ticket. He won. During the 9th parliament (2011 to 2016), he became a vocal critic of the way the NRM was governing the country. He outlined several areas of disagreement with his political party, including (a) the proposed conversion of Mabira Forest Reserve into sugar plantations (b) the proposed scrapping of bail for some crimes (c) he abhors the rampant corruption of the ruling class (d) he deplores the high unemployment rates among the country's youth and (e) he supports the restoration of presidential term-limits which was scrapped in 2005.

His open defiance of the NRM party, led to his expulsion from the NRM party, in April 2013, together with three other NRM members of parliament. The four became known as the "Rebel MPs". In September 2013 the Constitutional Court ruled 4–1, that the four MPs should step out of parliament until the same court deliberated on whether they should stay. Three days later, on 10 September 2013, the Supreme Court ruled 6–1 that the MPs should stay in parliament until the Constitutional Court completed its deliberations on whether they should stay. Finally on 12 February 2014, the Constitutional Court ruled that the four MPs should vacate parliament. That decision was overturned by the Supreme Court on 30 October 2015, and Nsereko and his colleagues returned to parliament as independents.

Muhammad Nsereko was re-elected to the 10th parliament (2016 to 2021), as an independent and he continues to be a leader against the ongoing amendment to change the constitution and remove the presidential age limit.

Nsereko was among the presidential aspirants who failed to be nominated as a presidential candidate under The Ecological party of Uganda in the 2026 general elections.

== See also ==
- Cabinet of Uganda
- List of members of the tenth Parliament of Uganda
- List of political parties in Uganda
