= Isaac Zebra Jr =

Ugandan boxer (born 2003)

Isaac Zebra Ssenyange Junior
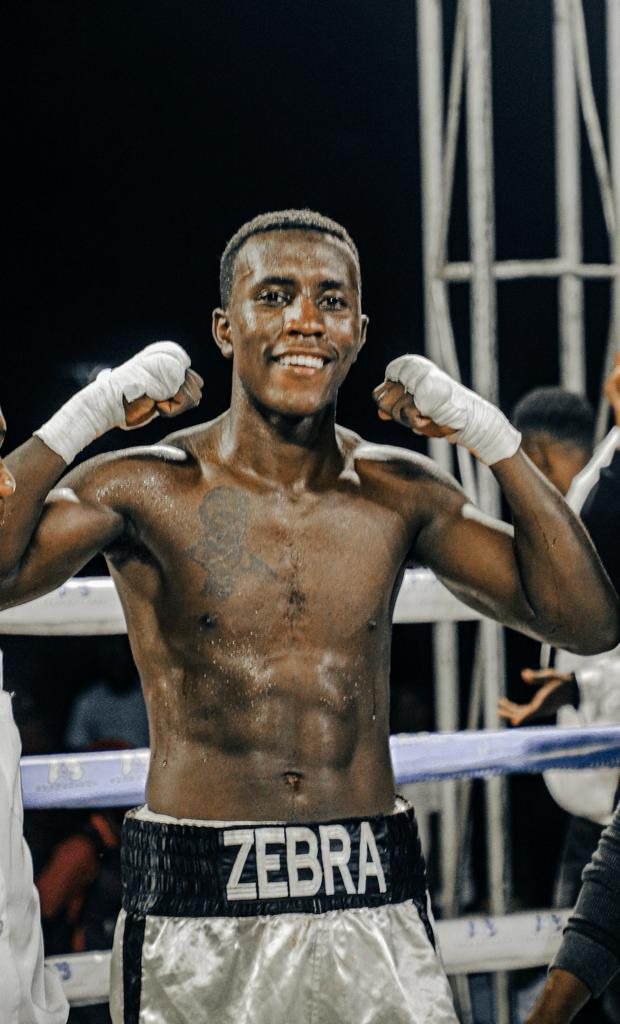

Personal information
- Nickname: Mando
- Nationality: Ugandan
- Born: 22 December 2003 (age 22) Kampala, Uganda
- Height: 1.73 m (5 ft 8 in)
- Weight: Welterweight

Boxing career
- Reach: 175 cm (69 in)
- Stance: Southpaw

Boxing record
- Total fights: 39
- Wins: 33
- Win by KO: 9
- Losses: 6
- Draws: 0
- No contests: 1

Isaac Zebra Ssenyange Junior (commonly known as Mando) (born 22 December 2003) is a Ugandan Olympic athlete and professional boxer. He has southpaw style of fighting. He made his professional debut on 26 December 2023.

== Early life and family background ==
Zebra Jr. was born in Kampala, Uganda. He grew up in Bwaise, where his late father (Zebra Mando Sr.) founded the Zebra Boxing Club, a community club that nurtured many young boxers. Following his father’s death in 2020, Zebra Jr. took on both boxing and leadership roles within the club.

== Amateur career ==
Zebra Jr represented Uganda in amateur competitions, including the 2022 Commonwealth Games in Birmingham, where he competed in the preliminary rounds.

== Commonwealth games 2022 ==
He was the youngest boxer of the Commonwealth Games 2022 which happened in the United Kingdom. Isaac Zebra Jr lost his match against Arena Pakela During the Birmingham 2022 Commonwealth Games Preliminaries of 32 at the National Exhibition Centre, Birmingham on 30 July 2022.

== Professional boxing record ==
He made his professional debut in December 2023 in Kampala, defeating Alibaba R Tarimo. In January 2024, he fought in Abu Dhabi, winning by technical knockout against Ibrahem Kandil. On 1 June 2024, he secured another victory against Abaasi Sseguya at Hamz Stadium, Nakivubo.

4 fights	4 wins	0 losses
By knockout	1	0
By decision	3	0

No.	Result	Record	Opponent	Type	Round, time	Date	Location	Notes
4	Win	4–0	(Uganda) Abaasi Sseguya	SD	6	Jun 01, 2024	Hamz Stadium Nakivubo Kampala, Uganda	
3	Win	3–0	(Egypt) Ahmed Saad	UD	6	Feb 03, 2024	(United Arab Emirates) Yas Links Golf Course, Abu Dhabi, UAE	
2	Win	2–0	(Egypt) Ibrahem Kandel	TKO	5 (6), 1:32	Jan 13, 2024	(United Arab Emirates) Abu Dhabi, UAE	
1	Win	1–0	(Tanzania) Alibaba R Tarimo	TKO	4	December 26, 2023	(Uganda) Lugogo Hockey Grounds, Kampala, UGA	

== Style ==
Zebra Jr. fights from a southpaw stance and has been praised for combining technical skill with aggression. He carries the nickname "Mando" in tribute to his father.

== Personal life ==
Beyond the ring, he helps run the Zebra Boxing Club, mentoring young boxers in Kampala.

== See also ==
- Zebra Boxing Club
- Muhammed Sebyala
- Zebra Mando
- Uganda Bombers
- Ntege Musa
- Yusuf Babu
