= Uganda Bombers =

Uganda national boxing team

Uganda
- Full name: Uganda national boxing team
- Short name(s): Uganda Bombers
- Coach(es): Patrick Lihanda
- Captain(s): Muzamir Semuddu

The Uganda Bombers are the Uganda national boxing team. They represent the country in international competitions such as the Olympic Games, Commonwealth Games, African Games, and continental championships. The team is managed by the Uganda Boxing Federation.

== History ==
Uganda has a strong tradition of boxing, and the Bombers are the flagship national side. Since the 20th century, Ugandan boxers have competed in regional and global tournaments, contributing to the country's international sporting recognition.

== Recent performance ==
At the 13th African Games in Accra, Ghana (2024), Uganda fielded a squad of seven boxers. Three of them; Muzamir Semuddu, Kasim Murungi, and Innocent Tumusiime won bronze medals. The team was captained by Muzamir Semuddu, under the technical guidance of coaches Patrick Lihanda and Juma Nsubuga.

== Achievements ==
=== Olympic Games ===
Ugandan boxers have historically been some of the country's top Olympic medalists, with all of Uganda's Olympic boxing medals won between 1968 and 1980.

Uganda Bombers at the Olympic Games
Year	Venue	Medal	Athlete	Weight category
1968	Mexico City	Bronze	Eridadi Mukwanga	Bantamweight
1968	Mexico City	Silver	Leo Rwabwogo	Flyweight
1972	Munich	Bronze	Leo Rwabwogo	Flyweight
1972	Munich	Bronze	Patrick Ddungu	Lightweight
1980	Moscow	Silver	John Mugabi	Welterweight

=== Commonwealth Games ===
Uganda has also produced multiple medalists at the Commonwealth Games through boxing.

Uganda Bombers Confirmed Commonwealth Games boxing medallists
Year	Venue	Medal	Athlete	Weight category / notes
1958	Cardiff	Silver	Thomas (Tom) Kawere	Welterweight. See boxing results archive for Cardiff 1958.
1962	Perth	Gold	George Oywello	Heavyweight — gold medallist at Perth 1962 (see event archive / athlete profile).
2006	Melbourne	Bronze	Martin Mubiru	Flyweight (51 kg). Listed in Melbourne 2006 boxing results.
2014	Glasgow	Bronze	Fazil Juma Kaggwa	Light-flyweight — confirmed by international boxing coverage.
2022	Birmingham	Bronze	Teddy Nakimuli	Women's Light-Flyweight (48–50 kg). Confirmed by contemporary media coverage.

=== African Games ===
At the 13th African Games (2024, Accra), Uganda secured three bronze medals through Muzamir Semuddu, Kasim Murungi, and Innocent Tumusiime.

Uganda Bombers at the African Games
Year	Venue	Medal	Athlete	Weight category
2024	Accra	Bronze	Muzamir Semuddu	Middleweight
2024	Accra	Bronze	Kasim Murungi	Bantamweight
2024	Accra	Bronze	Innocent Tumusiime	Flyweight

== Notable figures ==
- Shadir Musa Bwogi – welterweight boxer, captain of the Bombers, and competitor at the 2020 Summer Olympics.
- Muzamir Semuddu – captain during the 2024 African Games, bronze medalist.
- Patrick Lihanda – head coach of the Bombers.
- Juma Nsubuga – assistant coach.

== Challenges ==
The team has faced resource constraints, limited training facilities, and small squad sizes, which affect medal opportunities in major tournaments.

== See also ==
- Uganda Boxing Federation
- Isaac Zebra Jr
