= Uganda Boxing Federation =

Governing body of Boxing in Uganda

UBF
- Uganda Boxing Federation
- Abbreviation: UBF
- Founded: 1 January 1950; 76 years ago
- Founded at: Lugogo, Kampala, Uganda
- Type: Federation of national associations
- Legal status: Not-for-profit
- Purpose: Sport governance
- Headquarters: Lugogo, Kampala, Uganda
- Coordinates: 00°18′11″N 32°33′11″E
- Region served: Uganda
- Members: 35 clubs
- Official languages: English
- President: Moses Muhangi
- General Secretary: Simon Barigo
- National team coach: Patrick Lihanda
- Website: Official website

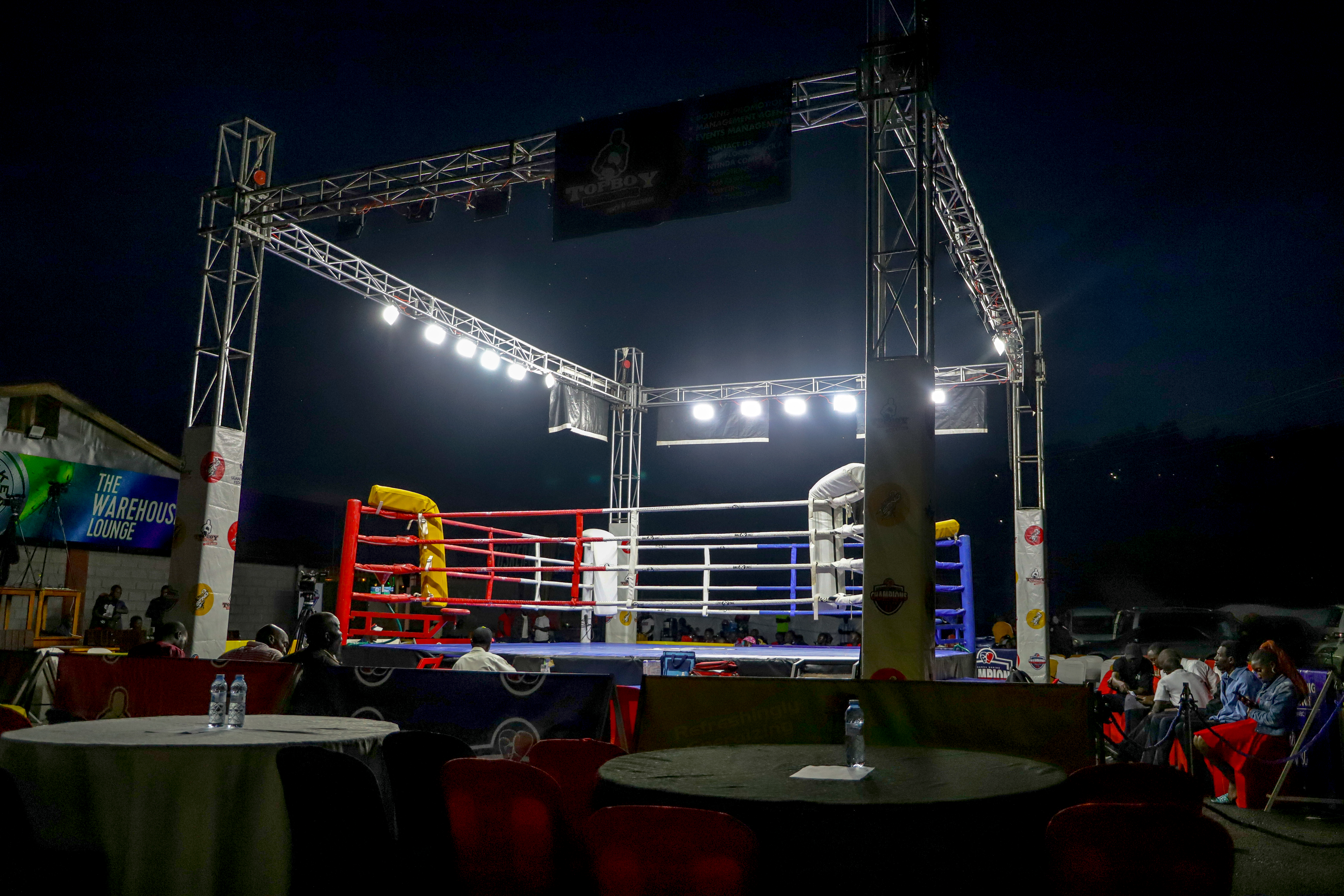
Boxing ring setup

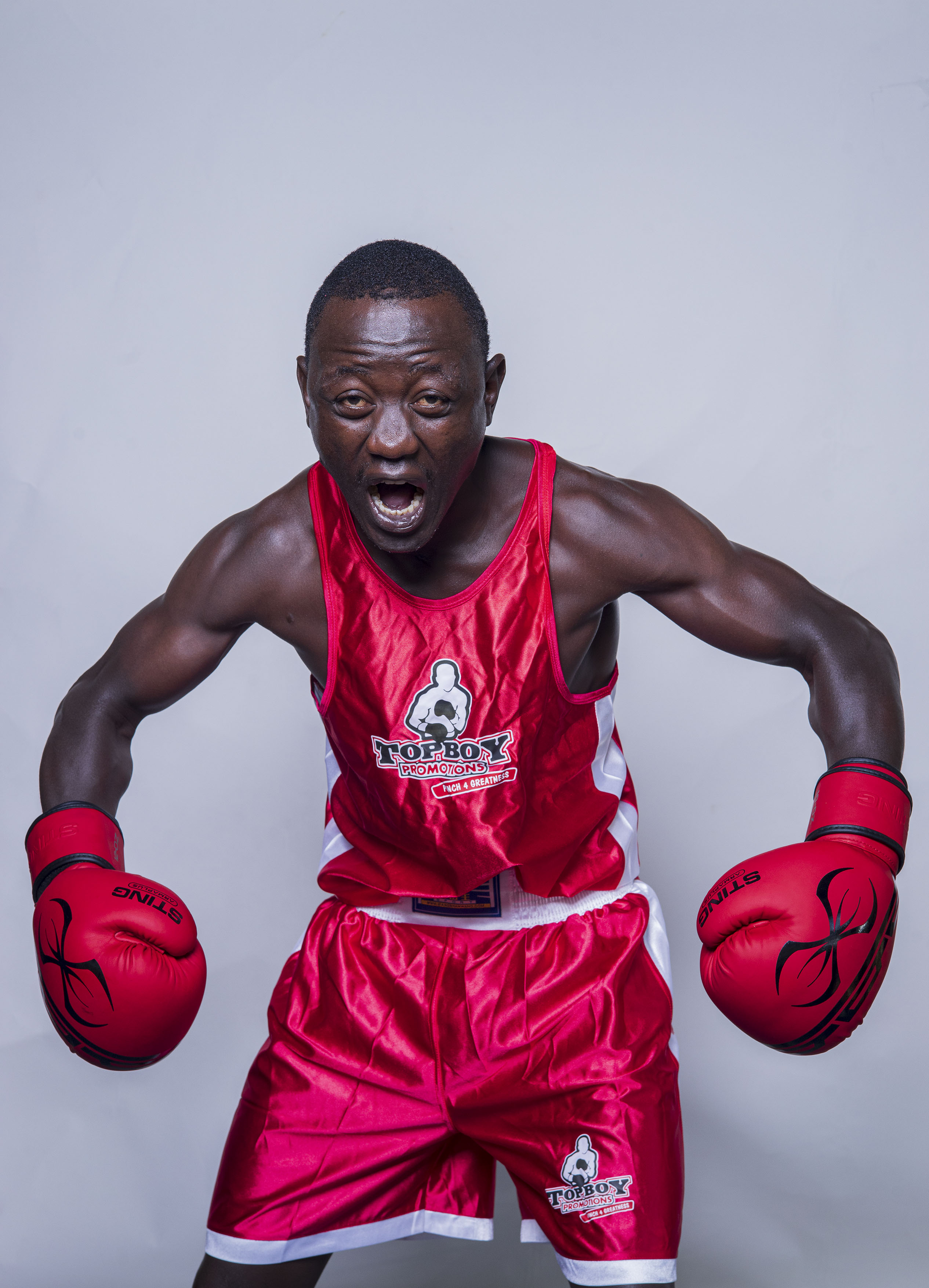
Wasswa Sali rated among UBF's under amateur league, light weight winners.

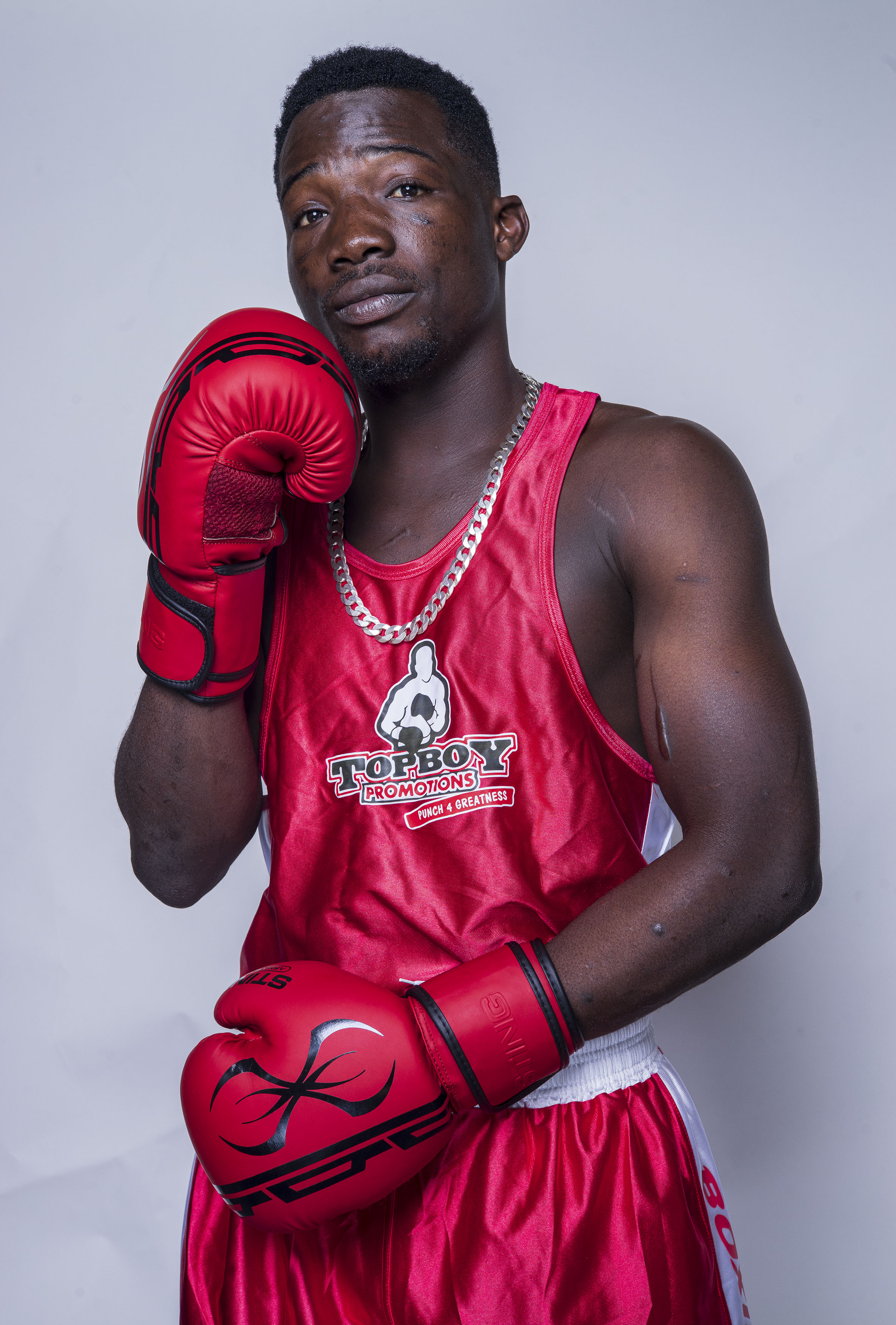
Matovu Ukasha Uganda Boxing Champions league welter weight.

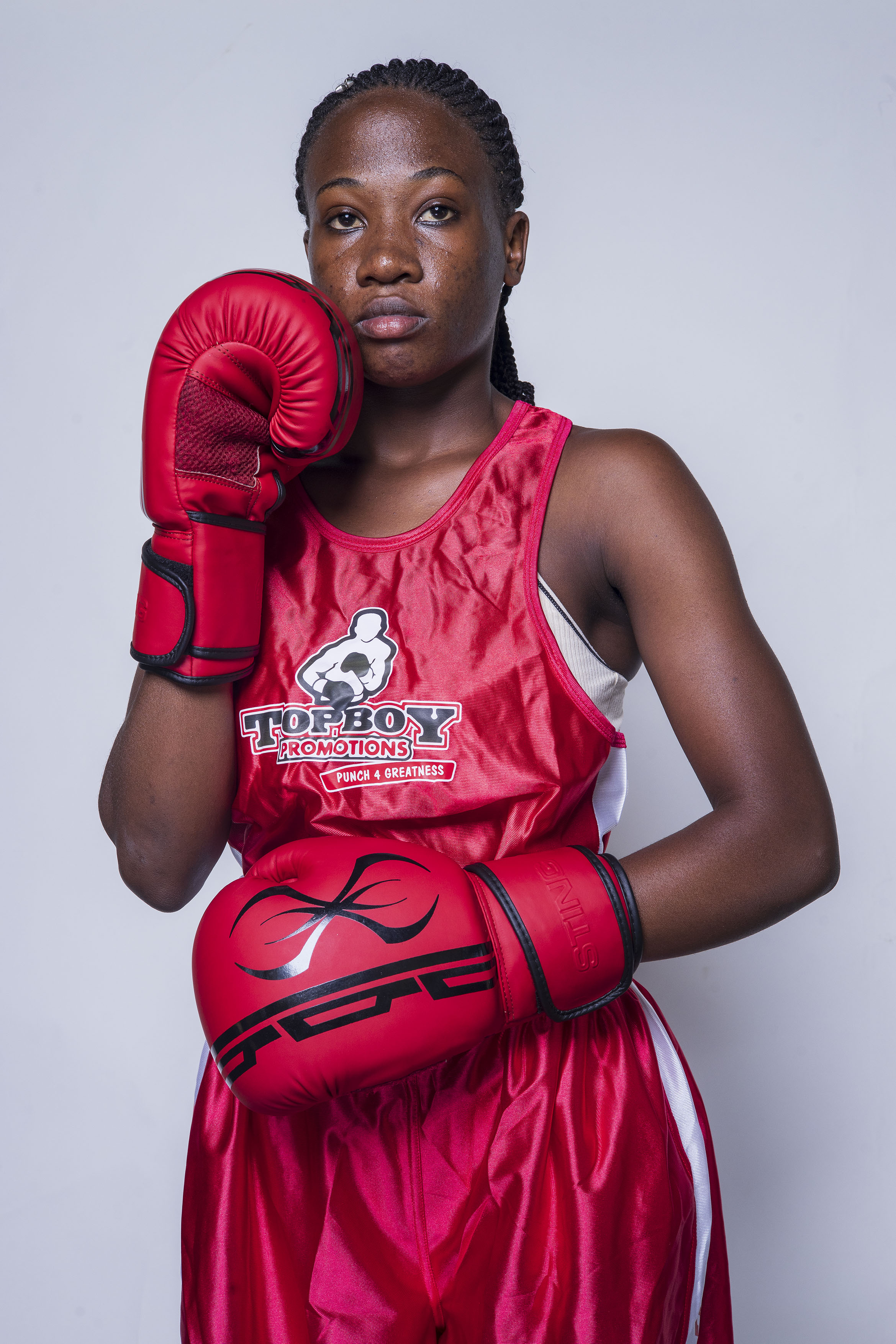
Nabikolo Fatuma representing in the Women boxing team

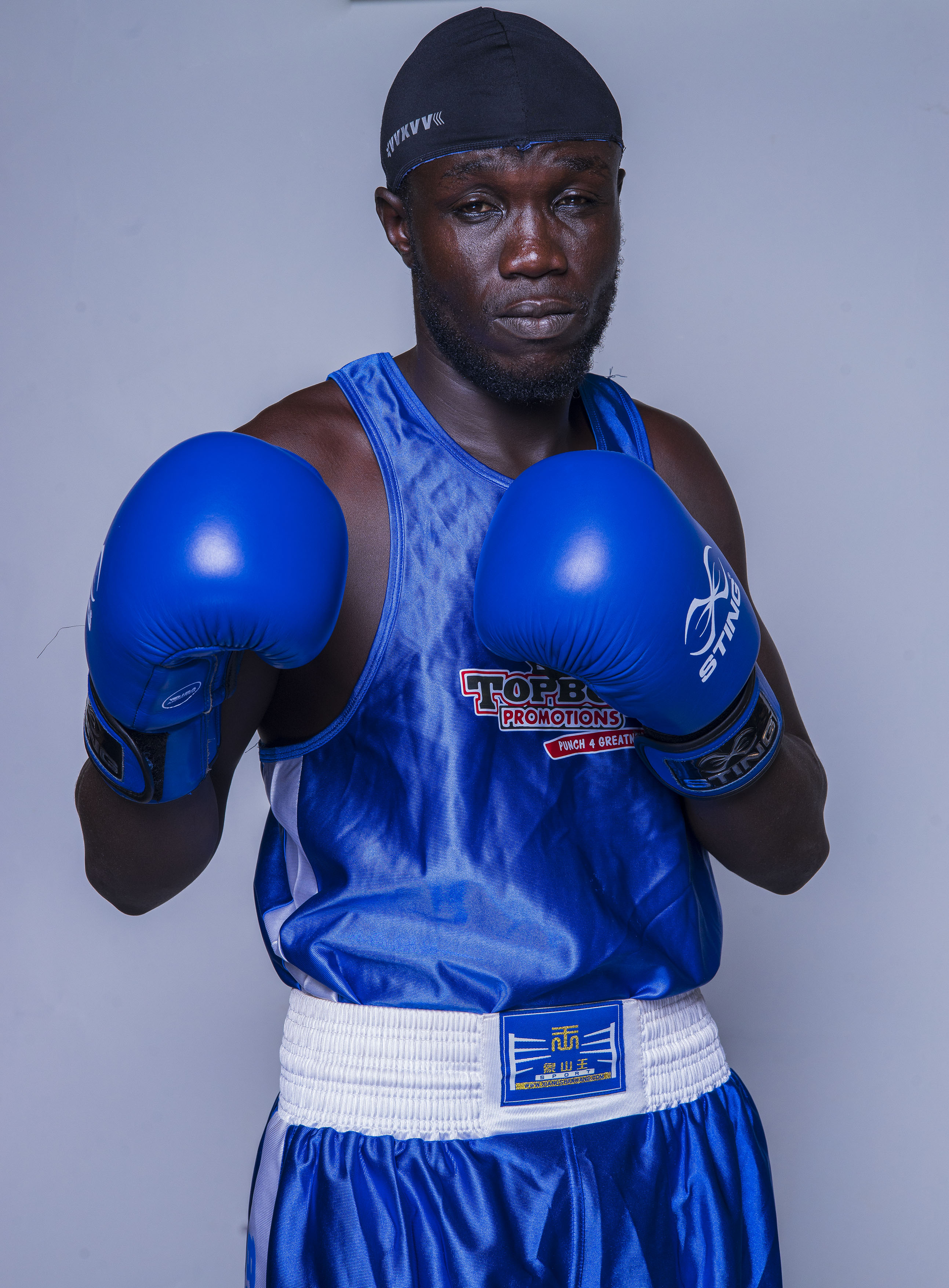
Adinan yasin Light weight Boxer

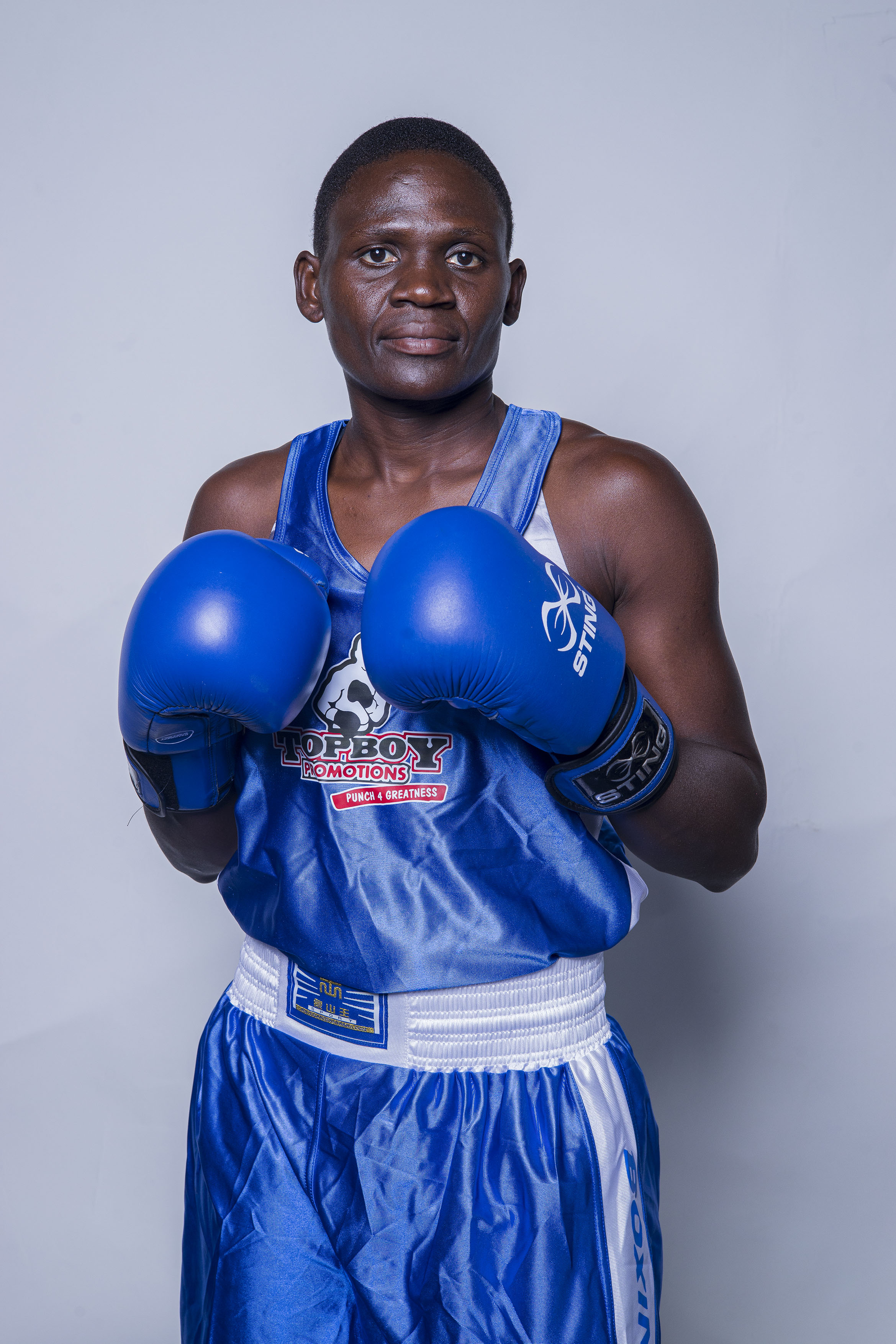
Nakalema Emily

The Uganda Boxing Federation (UBF) is the body mandated to organise, promote and develop the sport of boxing in Uganda as stipulated in the Sports Act of 1964 and other subsequent sports-related rules and regulations in Uganda. The UBF was founded in 1950 and is affiliated to the International Boxing Association. It is overseen by the National Sports Council (NCS) of Uganda.

The competitions organized by UBF are as such-The National Open Boxing Championship, Novice Boxing Championship, Intermediate Boxing Championship, Junior Boxing Championship and the schools Boxing Championship.

== Location ==
The Uganda Boxing Federation headquarters is on Plot 2-10 Coronation Avenue, Lugogo Sports Complex in Kampala District.

== Organisation ==
Uganda Boxing is an affiliate of the National Sports Council, the Uganda Olympic Committee, the African Boxing Union and the International Boxing Association. The federation has 47 affiliated clubs, 10 provisional clubs and over 300 unregistered boxing clubs.

== Roles ==
- It confirms the National boxing team that participates in the various boxing competitions.

== Partnerships ==
In 2022, Uganda's national boxing team, "the Bombers," competed in the 2022 Commonwealth Games, which took place in the United Kingdom.

Probellum, a global boxing company in 2021, signed a partnership with the Uganda Boxing Federation to develop talented amateur fighters in Uganda and give them a platform to showcase their abilities on a global level.

In December 2021, UBF partnered with Next Media Services to broadcast the inaugural Uganda Boxing Champions League live on NBS Television.

In June 2022, Crown Beverages Limited, under the energy drink Sting, partnered with the Uganda Boxing Federation with a sponsorship package of USD 75000.

== Presidents ==
- Moses Muhangi, January 2018 to date (As on 2024).

== Vice Presidents ==
- Sula Kamoga, 2024.

== Competitions organised by UBF ==
- National Boxing Open Championship.

== Controversies ==
=== IBA President visits Uganda ===
On 2 December 2022, the President of the International Boxing Association, Umar Nazarovich Kremlev, paid a one-day visit to Uganda, where he launched the construction of a boxing academy.

"To see how dreams of young athletes come true is the most important part of the whole mission of IBA. Athletes need to be raised inside their country to glory its flag and anthem. The mission of sports officials is to create conditions for it". Kremlev speaking of young boxers in Uganda

== See also ==
- National Open Boxing Championship (Uganda)
- Uganda national boxing team
- Uganda Boxing Champions League
