= Super 8 Boxing Tournament =

Boxing competitions

Super 8
- Sport: Boxing
- Founded: 2014
- Owner: John McRae
- Commissioner: New Zealand National Boxing Federation
- Country: New Zealand
- Venues: The Trusts Arena; North Shore Events Centre; Horncastle Arena; SkyCity Auckland
- Most recent champions: Israel Adesanya (Cruiserweight); Reece Papuni (Light Heavyweight)
- Most titles: Israel Adesanya (2)
- Broadcasters: Sky Arena (Super Eight 1,2,3); Sky Sports (Super Eight 4)
- Sponsors: NZ Boxer; Rockstar energy drink Mahindra
- Website: VSLive

The Super 8 Boxing Tournament is a professional boxing tournament that is held in New Zealand. Super 8 is owned by John McRae, who is the managing director of VADR Media. VS Live was formerly known as Sky Arena. Sky ARENA was previously owned by SKY Television New Zealand and VADR Media. In 2015 VADR Media acquired 100% of SKY ARENA shares and relaunched as VS LIVE.

== Tournament format ==
Super 8 is a last man standing eight man tournament that is compete in one night. Seven boxing bouts will be contested in one night, each bout being scheduled for three rounds, each round being three mins with a minute break in between rounds. If after three rounds a fight is declared a draw, an extra round maybe required to determine the winner. Judges will not be encouraged to draw fights but will be accepted in the case of close contests. In the event of a draw after a fourth round, the winner will be decided in consultation with the Referee and fight Supervisor. If an injury occurs to a winning boxer that eliminates him from the competition, he is to be replaced by the most deserving or merit worthy losing boxer from the earlier competition or reserve fight winner as decided by the Supervisor. A random draw out of a hat will be conducted to determine which fighters contest each other in four quarter final matches. Super 8 IV was not scheduled for its usual eight man tournament, but instead replaced by two four man tournaments, in which both tournaments were different weight divisions.

== Super 8 I (Heavyweight) ==
The first Super 8 was competed on 4 June 2014 at The Trusts Arena, Auckland, New Zealand. The Undercard also featured Hemi Ahio vs Will Quarrie, Dimitri Simoukov vs Joe Blackbourn and Sam Rapira vs Taito Ratuere.

Quarterfinals
(United States) Hasim Rahman
(New Zealand) Anthony Nansen	UD
(Republic of Ireland) Martin Rogan
(England) Michael Sprott	MD
(United States) Alonzo Butler
(New Zealand) Brice Ritani Coe	SD
(New Zealand) Kali Meehan	SD
(Australia) Hunter Sam

Semifinals
(New Zealand) Anthony Nansen
(England) Michael Sprott	UD
(New Zealand) Brice Ritani Coe
(New Zealand) Kali Meehan	UD

Final
(England) Michael Sprott	1st Rd
(New Zealand) Kali Meehan	TKO

== Super 8 II (Cruiserweight I) ==
The second Super 8 was competed on 22 November 2014 at North Shore Events Centre, North Shore, Auckland, New Zealand. The Undercard also featured Willis Meehan vs Will Quarrie, David Aloua vs Anthony McCracken and Kali Meehan vs Shane Cameron.

Quarterfinals
(Ghana) (Fiji) Joseph Kwadjo
(Australia) Brad Pitt	UD
(Nigeria) (New Zealand) Israel Adesanya
(Australia) Daniel Ammann	UD
(New Zealand) James Emmerson	3rd Rd
(Samoa) (New Zealand) Monty Filimaea	KO
(New Zealand) Lance Bryant
(Samoa) Vaitele Soi	SD

Semifinals
(Australia) Brad Pitt	UD
(Australia) Daniel Ammann
(Samoa) (New Zealand) Monty Filimaea
(Samoa) Vaitele Soi	UD

Final
(Australia) Brad Pitt	MD
(Samoa) Vaitele Soi

== Super 8 III (Cruiserweight II) ==
The third Super 8 was competed on 28 March 2015 at Horncastle Arena, Christchurch, New Zealand. The Undercard also featured Hemi Ahio vs Clarence Tillman, Monty Betham vs Adam Hollioake and Anthony McCracken vs Vaitele Soi.

Quarterfinals
(United States) Brian Minto	TKO
(Samoa) (New Zealand) Monty Filimaea	2nd Rd
(Samoa) Falani Tavu'i
(Australia) Daniel Ammann	UD
(New Zealand) Asher Derbyshire	2nd Rd
(Nigeria) (New Zealand) Israel Adesanya	KO
(Ghana) (Fiji) Joseph Kwadjo
(New Zealand) Lance Bryant	UD

Semifinals
(United States) Brian Minto	UD
(Australia) Daniel Ammann
(Nigeria) (New Zealand) Israel Adesanya	MD
(New Zealand) Lance Bryant

Final
(United States) Brian Minto	4th Rd
(Nigeria) (New Zealand) Israel Adesanya	SD

== Super 8 IV (Cruiserweight III & Light Heavyweight) ==
The fourth Super 8 was competed on 3 November 2015 at Sky City Convention Centre, Auckland, New Zealand. The Undercard also featured Hemi Ahio vs Alapati A'asa, Monty Betham vs James Langton and Paul Gallen vs Bodene Thompson.

Semifinals
1	(New Zealand) Zane Hopman
4	(Nigeria) (New Zealand) Israel Adesanya	UD
3	(New Zealand) Lance Bryant	UD
2	(New Zealand) (Australia) James Porter

Finals
(Nigeria) (New Zealand) Israel Adesanya	UD
(New Zealand) Lance Bryant

Semifinals
1	(New Zealand) Robert Berridge	UD
4	(New Zealand) Sefo Falekaono	4th Rd
3	(New Zealand) Reece Papuni	UD
2	(New Zealand) Brad Riddell	4th Rd

Finals
(New Zealand) Robert Berridge	4th Rd
(New Zealand) Reece Papuni	SD
