= Lance Bryant =

New Zealand boxer

Personal information
- Nickname: Buster
- Born: 1 November 1980 (age 46) Masterton, New Zealand
- Height: 181 cm (5 ft 11 in)
- Weight: Cruiserweight

Boxing career

Boxing record
- Total fights: 20
- Wins: 12
- Win by KO: 5
- Losses: 8

Lance Bryant (born 1 November 1980) is a retired New Zealand professional boxer.

Bryant is mostly known for competing in three of the four Super 8 Boxing Tournament. He reached his peak ranking position in 2018 when he was ranked 50th on Boxrec. In his professional career he has won six professional titles, including being a Two time New Zealand Cruiserweight champion.

== Amateur boxing career ==
Bryant had a successful amateur career, winning multiple titles. In 2006, Bryant retired from boxing.

== Professional boxing career ==
=== Debut and Super 8 Boxing Tournament 2014 - 2015 ===
Bryant made his professional boxing debut in 2014 after initially retiring in 2006. Bryant took on Thomas Heads in back to back fights. Bryant won the first fight by Knockout and the second fight by decision. In November 2014, Bryant took part in the second Super Professional eight man boxing tournament, called the Super 8 at the North Shore Events Centre. To prepare for the fight, Bryant trained alongside Shane Cameron with trainer Henry Schuster. The tournament included future UFC World Champion Israel Adesanya, Daniel Ammann, James Emerson, Monty Filimaea, Brad Pitt and Vaitele Soi. Bryant took on Samoan Soi in the quarter finals, losing the fight by a controversial Split Decision. Bryant returned to the ring in 2015 to take part in the third edition of the Super 8 Tournament in Christchurch, New Zealand. In the quarter finals, Bryant took on Ghana born Fiji resident boxer Joseph Kwadjo. Bryant won the fight by unanimous decision moving onto the semi-finals. Byrant too on Israel Adesanya in the semi-finals, however, Adesanya won the fight by Majority decision, ending Bryant second tournament. In November 2015, Bryant took part in the final edition of the Super 8 Tournaments, but this time this was a four-man professional tournament. Bryant hopes to defeat Adesanya who beat Bryant in the last tournament who went on to win the entire competition. Bryant won the semi-finals against New Zealand Born Australian Jamie Porter but lost against Adesanya in the Finals. On the same night, Monty Betham Won the New Zealand title. Bryant called out Betham in hopes for a New Zealand title shot. Unfortunately the fight did not take place as Betham was forced to retire due to brain injury in 2016.

=== National and International title wins 2016 - 2017 ===
In May 2016, Bryant took on Monty Filimaea in his first fight in Hometown of Pahiatua since turning pro. His brother Robbie Bryant also fought on the card for his first fight in New Zealand in his professional career and his last fight of his boxing career. Bryant won the fight by Unanimous Decision. After the fight Filimaea announced his retirement from boxing. In June 2016, Bryant took on James Langton on a weeks notice after Monty Betham pulled out due to a brain injury. The fight was for the Interim New Zealand national (NZNBF version) and vacant IBO Asia Pacific Cruiserweight titles. Bryant won the fight by Unanimous Decision. In October 2016, Bryant took on Thomas Heads in their third and final time for the World Boxing Federation Oceania Cruiserweight title. Bryant won the final fight of the trilogy by Stoppage in the tenth round. In May 2017, Bryant took on Junior Fas Brother Isileli Fa to defend her New Zealand National title. Since winning the Interim version of the NZ title, he has been upgraded to being a full New Zealand National Cruiserweight title. Bryant won the fight by second round stoppage. In July 2017, Bryant was scheduled to fight Junior Pati for his New Zealand national and vacant UBF Asia Pacific Cruiserweight titles. Unfortunately Junior Pati pulled out of the fight due to feeling unwell from the weight loss. However, Junior Pati fought anyway with a different opponent in the Heavyweight division for the UBF Asia Pacific Heavyweight title. In September 2017, Bryant took on Aaron Russell for the vacant IBO Oceania-Orient Cruiserweight title. Russell is known as the Kiwi beater after defeated multiple successful New Zealand boxers including James Porter, Asher Derbyshire and Nik Charalampous. Bryant won the fight by second-round knockout.

=== Last NZ title, losing streak, retirement 2018 - 2020 ===
In March 2018, Bryant returned to his hometown to take on Thomas Russell for the vacant New Zealand National (Pro Box NZ version) Cruiserweight title. Bryant won the fight by Unanimous Decision however he sustained a serious injury to his arm which required surgery. After the fight he reached 50th in the World on Boxrec, the highest ranking he has ever received in his career. In August 2018, Bryant took on former world title challenger Blake Caparello. Unfortunately, Bryant lost the fight by third round stoppage, ending his two-year and seven fight winning streak. In November 2018, Bryant made his Northern Hemisphere debut when he took on Poland Nikodem Jeżewski on short notice. Bryant lost the fight by unanimous decision. In December 2018, Bryant took on David Light on a Joseph Parker undercard. Bryant lost the fight by second round stoppage. In March 2020, Bryant fought for the last time in Australia against New Zealand born Australian Floyd Masson. Masson won the fight by first round stoppage. In November 2020, Bryant took on David Light for the New Zealand National (PBCNZ version) Cruiserweight title. Light won the fight by first round stoppage. After the fight, Bryant announced his retirement.

== Amateur boxing titles ==
- 2004 New Zealand Amateur Champions (81 kg)
- 1999 New Zealand Amateur Champions (75 kg)
- 1997 New Zealand Intermediate Amateur Champions (75 kg)
- 1996 New Zealand Junior Amateur Champion (75 kg)
- 1995 New Zealand Junior Amateur Champion (81 kg)

== Professional boxing titles ==
- New Zealand National Boxing Federation
  - Interim New Zealand National Cruiserweight Champion
  - New Zealand National Cruiserweight Champion
- World Boxing Federation
  - Oceania Cruiserweight Champion
- International Boxing Organisation
  - Oceania-Oriental Cruiserweight Champion
  - Asia Pacific Cruiserweight Champion
- Pro Box NZ
  - New Zealand National Cruiserweight Title

== Professional boxing record ==
20 fights	12 wins	8 losses
By knockout	5	4
By decision	7	4
Draws	0	

No.	Result	Record	Opponent	Type	Round, time	Date	Location	Notes
20	Lose	12–8	David Light	TKO	2 (10), 1:09	13 Nov 2020	Sky City Theatre, Auckland, New Zealand	For New Zealand National (PBCNZ version) Cruiserweight title
19	Lose	12–7	Floyd Masson	TKO	2 (6), 2:45	6 Mar 2020	Metro City, Northbridge, Western Australia, Australia	
18	Lose	12–6	David Light	TKO	2 (6)	15 Dec 2018	Horncastle Arena, Christchurch, New Zealand	
17	Lose	12–5	Nikodem Jeżewski	UD	8	9 Nov 2018	Hala Widowiskowo Sportowa MOSiR, ul. ks.Jerzego Popiełuszki 4, Konin, Poland	
16	Lose	12–4	Blake Caparello	TKO	3 (8), 1:46	31 Aug 2018	Croatian Club, Footscray, Victoria, Australia	
15	Win	12–3	Thomas Russell	UD	10	24 Mar 2018	Bush Multisport Stadium, Pahiatua, New Zealand	Won Vacant New Zealand National (Pro Box NZ) cruiserweight title
14	Win	11–3	Aaron Russell	KO	2 (10), 2:59	9 Sep 2017	Mansfield Tavern, Mansfield, Queensland, Australia	Won Vacant IBO Oceania-Orient cruiserweight title
13	Win	10–3	Isileli Fa	TKO	2 (10)	5 May 2017	Arena Manawatu, Palmerston North, New Zealand	Retained New Zealand National (NZNBF version) cruiserweight title
12	Win	9–3	Thomas Heads	TKO	10 (10), 0:30	8 Oct 2016	Civic Centre, Feilding, New Zealand	Won vacant World Boxing Federation Oceania Cruiserweight titles
11	Win	8–3	James Langton	UD	10	30 Jun 2016	Standfords Event Centre, Opunake, New Zealand	Won vacant Interim New Zealand National (NZNBF version) & vacant IBO Asia Pacific Cruiserweight titles
10	Win	7–3	Monty Filimaea	UD	6	28 May 2016	Bush Multisport Stadium, Pahiatua, New Zealand	
9	Win	6–3	Paane Haraki	UD	4	2 Apr 2016	Southwards Car Museum, Kapiti, New Zealand	
8	Lose	5–3	Israel Adesanya	UD	3	3 Nov 2015	Sky City Convention Centre, Auckland, New Zealand	Finals - Super 8 Tournament
7	Win	5–2	Jamie Porter	UD	3	3 Nov 2015	Sky City Convention Centre, Auckland, New Zealand	Semi-finals - Super 8 Tournament
6	Lose	4–2	Israel Adesanya	MD	3	28 Mar 2015	Horncastle Arena, Christchurch, New Zealand	Semi-finals - Super 8 Tournament
5	Win	4–1	Joseph Kwadjo	UD	3	28 Mar 2015	Horncastle Arena, Christchurch, New Zealand	Quarter-finals - Super 8 Tournament
4	Lose	3–1	Vaitele Soi	SD	3	11 Nov 2014	North Shore Events Centre, Auckland, New Zealand	Quarter-finals - Super 8 Tournament
3	Win	3–0	Chris Rehu	TKO	2 (4), 1:15	16 Aug 2014	Turner Centre, KeriKeri, New Zealand	
2	Win	2–0	Thomas Heads	UD	4	19 Jul 2014	ABA Stadium, Auckland, New Zealand	
1	Win	1–0	Thomas Heads	KO	3 (4)	22 Feb 2014	ABA Stadium, Auckland, New Zealand	

== Personal life ==
Bryant has three brothers, Francis, Hugh, and Robbie. Including himself, all the brothers are New Zealand National Amateur Champions. Bryant is a farther of four children. Bryant is of Maori descent.
