= Israel Adesanya =

Nigerian and New Zealand mixed martial artist (born 1989)

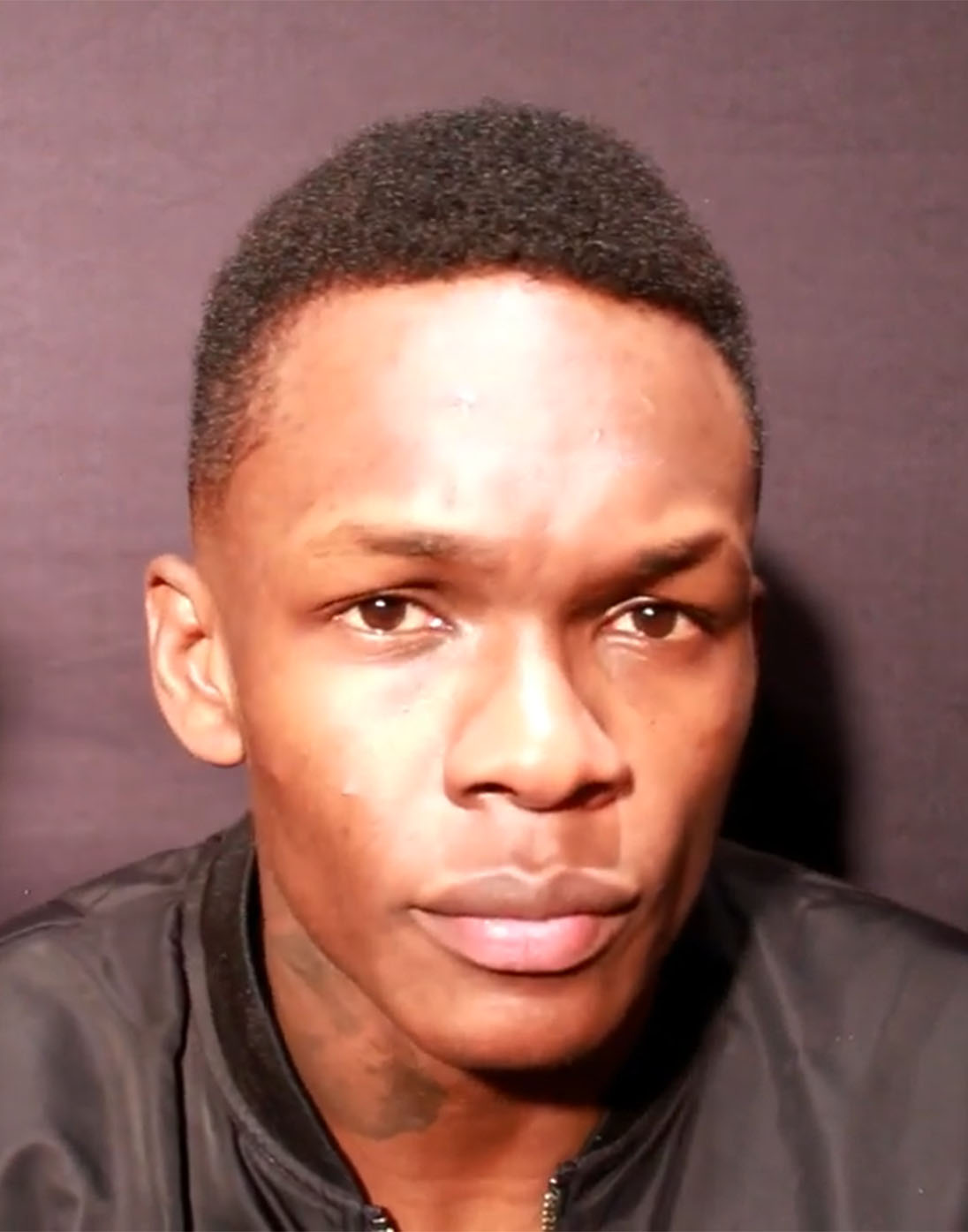
- Adesanya at UFC 230 in 2018
- Born: Israel Mobolaji Temitayo Odunayo Oluwafemi Owolabi Adesanya; 22 July 1989 (age 37); Lagos, Lagos State, Nigeria
- Nickname: The Last Stylebender
- Citizenship: Nigeria; New Zealand
- Height: 6 ft 4 in (1.93 m)
- Weight: 185 lb (84 kg; 13 st 3 lb)
- Division: Middleweight (2012–present); Light Heavyweight (2021)
- Reach: 80 in (203 cm)
- Style: Kickboxing
- Fighting out of: Auckland, New Zealand
- Team: City Kickboxing (2009–2026)
- Trainer: Eugene Bareman (head coach); Andrei Păuleț (wrestling)
- Rank: Purple belt in Brazilian Jiu-Jitsu under André Galvão
- Years active: 2010–present

Professional boxing record
- Total: 6
- Wins: 5
- By knockout: 1
- Losses: 1

Kickboxing record
- Total: 80
- Wins: 75
- By knockout: 27
- Losses: 5
- By knockout: 1

Mixed martial arts record
- Total: 30
- Wins: 24
- By knockout: 16
- By decision: 8
- Losses: 6
- By knockout: 3
- By submission: 1
- By decision: 2

Other information
- Boxing record from BoxRec
- Mixed martial arts record from Sherdog

YouTube information
- Channel: FREESTYLEBENDER
- Subscribers: 1.31 million
- Views: 217.5 million
- Last updated: 17 January 2026

Israel Mobolaji Temitayo Odunayo Oluwafemi Owolabi Adesanya (born 22 July 1989) is a Nigerian-New Zealander professional mixed martial artist, former kickboxer, and boxer. As a mixed martial artist, he currently competes in the Middleweight division of the Ultimate Fighting Championship (UFC), where he is a former two-time UFC Middleweight Champion. In kickboxing, he is a former Glory Middleweight Championship title challenger. As of 24 October 2026, he is #10 in the Meta UFC middleweight rankings.

== Early life and background ==
Adesanya was born in Lagos, Nigeria, the eldest of five children. His father, Oluwafemi, is an accountant and his mother, Taiwo, is a nurse. He is ethnic Yoruba. Adesanya attended Chrisland School, Opebi, and enrolled in its Taekwondo after-school club until he was removed by his mother due to an injury.

In 1999, he relocated to Ghana with his family for 10 months, but due to his parents wanting their children to receive a well-recognised higher education, he settled in Rotorua, New Zealand, at age 10 and attended Rotorua Boys' High School. Adesanya was not interested in sports during high school; instead he was interested in Japanese anime such as Death Note and the manga series Naruto. Adesanya was bullied during his high school years and attributes his decision to pursue martial arts later in life to the mistreatment he experienced. Adesanya's first exposure to fighting and an early influence on him was watching the British boxer Prince Naseem Hamed. He stated that in an interview, "I remember watching him, mesmerized at what I saw, how we came to the ring and did that flip. That was one of my earliest memories of showmanship."

Following high school graduation, Adesanya enrolled in a Bachelor of Science in Computer Design at the Universal College of Learning in Whanganui. At the age of 18, he started training in kickboxing, after being inspired by the Muay Thai film Ong-Bak. Two years later Adesanya made the decision to cease his studies in pursuit of a career in kickboxing and went on to amass an amateur record of 32–1 before turning professional and fighting in China. At the age of 21, Adesanya moved to Auckland, New Zealand, and began training in mixed martial arts under Eugene Bareman at City Kickboxing, with future UFC fighters such as Dan Hooker, Kai Kara-France and UFC Featherweight Champion Alexander Volkanovski. He trains in wrestling under the Romanian New Zealander Andrei Păuleț.

== Professional kickboxing career ==
=== Early beginnings ===
In his early career he amassed a long winning streak in New Zealand, Australia and had numerous bouts with Wu Lin Feng in China. His winning streak earned him a place in the 2014 Kunlun Fight 80 kg tournament, held during Kunlun Fight 2. He lost the semifinal bout against Simon Marcus by an extra round split decision. Adesanya afterwards made his Glory debut at Glory 15, when he faced Filip Verlinden. Verlinden won the fight by unanimous decision. The two of them fought a rematch at Glory of Heroes 3, two years after their first fight, with Adesanya winning a unanimous decision.

Adesanya participated in the King in the Ring Cruiserweights II tournament of the regional circuit in New Zealand. In the quarterfinal, he beat Slava Alexeichik by unanimous decision, in the semifinal he beat Pati Afoa by knockout and won the tournament with a knockout of Jamie Eades. Six months later, he took part in the 2015 Cruiserweights III tournament. He scored technical knockouts of Kim Loudon and Mark Timms in the quarterfinal and semifinal bouts respectively, before winning the tournament for the second time with a first-round knockout of Pati Afoa.

Moving up in weight, Adesanya participated in the 2015 The Heavyweights III, as well. He defeated Nase Foai by TKO in the quarterfinal and Dan Roberts by KO in the semifinal, before facing Jamie Eades in the finals. The two had previously met in the final of the 2014 Cruiserweight tournament. Adesanya won the tournament final by unanimous decision.

=== Glory of Heroes ===
Adesanya won five of his next six fights, including victories over Yousri Belgaroui and Bogdan Stoica. His loss came at the hands of future GLORY Middleweight champion Alex Pereira, who won by unanimous decision.

=== Glory ===
Adesanya participated in the 2016 Glory Middleweight Contender Tournament. He defeated Robert Thomas by unanimous decision in the semifinals, and won the tournament with a split decision victory over Yousri Belgaroui. He fought Jason Wilnis for the Glory Middleweight championship at Glory 37: Los Angeles. Wilnis won the fight by unanimous decision, although the result was considered controversial.

=== Return to Glory of Heroes and final bout ===
His last kickboxing fight, before transitioning to mixed martial arts, was a rematch with Alex Pereira at Glory of Heroes 7. Pereira won the fight by knockout, after dropping Adesanya with a short left hook in the third round.

Adesanya retired from kickboxing peaking at #4 in the ranking system.

== Professional mixed martial arts career ==
=== Early career ===
Adesanya made his professional debut in 2012, with a TKO win against James Griffiths. He scored another TKO win against John Vake, before taking a two-year hiatus from mixed martial arts. He returned to MMA in August 2015, when he won the fight against Song Kenan by TKO. He went on to amass an 8–0 record, fighting mostly in Oceanian and Chinese circuits. During this run, he won the AFC Middleweight Championship at Australia Fighting Championship 20 with a first-round TKO over Melvin Guillard, as well as the Hex Fight Series Middleweight championship with a first-round KO of Stuart Dare.

=== Ultimate Fighting Championship ===
In December 2017, it was announced that Adesanya had signed a contract with the UFC. He made his debut against Rob Wilkinson on 11 February 2018, at UFC 221. He won the fight via technical knockout in the second round. This fight earned him a Performance of the Night award.

Adesanya's next fight took place on 14 April 2018, against Marvin Vettori at UFC on Fox 29. He won the match by split decision. 15 out of 17 media outlets scored the bout for Adesanya.

Adesanya then faced Brad Tavares on 6 July 2018, at The Ultimate Fighter 27 Finale. Adesanya won the one-sided fight via unanimous decision. This win earned him his second Performance of the Night award.

Adesanya faced Derek Brunson on 3 November 2018, at UFC 230. He won the fight via technical knockout in round one. This win earned him the Performance of the Night award for a third time.

While initially expected to serve as the co-main event, Adesanya faced former UFC Middleweight Champion Anderson Silva on 10 February 2019, in the main event of UFC 234. He won the fight via unanimous decision. This fight earned both competitors the Fight of the Night award.

==== UFC Middleweight Championship ====
Adesanya faced Kelvin Gastelum for the interim UFC Middleweight Championship on 13 April 2019, in the co-main event of UFC 236. He won the back-and-forth fight via unanimous decision, with all three judges scoring the fight 48–46. This fight earned him the Fight of the Night award. The fight was widely regarded as the best fight of the year, earning the nomination from most of the MMA news outlets.

Adesanya then faced Robert Whittaker in a title unification bout on 6 October 2019, headlining UFC 243 for UFC Middleweight Championship. After a knockdown in last second of the first round, Adesanya won the fight via knockout in the second round. This win earned him his fourth Performance of the Night award. Him and Kamaru Usman becoming UFC champions was ranked as the 29th most memorable moment in Nigerian sports history since 1960 by Premium Times in 2020, one of only four combat sports-related moments.

Adesanya next faced three-time UFC title challenger Yoel Romero on 7 March 2020 UFC 248. He won the fight via unanimous decision, with scores of 48–47, 48–47 and 49–46 and defended his title for the first time. Many fans and pundits felt disappointed due to the low activity by both fighters which resulted in a largely uneventful fight in which neither fighter was able to deliver any significant offense.

In his next title defense, Adesanya faced fellow undefeated fighter Paulo Costa on 27 September 2020 at UFC 253. This marked the first time two male unbeaten mixed martial artists met in a title fight since 2009. He won the fight via technical knockout in the second round. This win earned him his fifth Performance of the Night award. After the bout, Adesanya's visible right-breast gynecomastia drummed up controversy due to possible PEDs use, though Adesanya claimed it was due to his usage of marijuana. Adesanya also caused additional controversy by simulating anal sex on the prone Costa at the end of the fight.

Adesanya moved up a weight class and faced Jan Błachowicz for the UFC Light Heavyweight Championship on 6 March 2021, headlining UFC 259. At the weigh-ins, Adesanya did not cut weight and came in at 200.5 pounds, five pounds away from the light heavyweight limit. He lost the fight via unanimous decision, with scores of 49–46, 49–45 and 49–45, marking the first time he has been defeated in mixed martial arts.

Adesanya rematched Marvin Vettori for the UFC Middleweight Championship on 12 June 2021, headlining UFC 263. Adesanya controlled a majority of the fight winning via unanimous decision, with all three judges scoring the fight 50–45.

A rematch between Adesanya and Robert Whittaker for the UFC Middleweight Championship took place on 12 February 2022 at UFC 271. Adesanya won the rematch via unanimous decision, with scores of 48–47, 48–47 and 49–46.

Adesanya faced Jared Cannonier on 2 July 2022, at UFC 276. He won the bout via unanimous decision. This win earn him the Crypto.com Fan Bonus of the Night first place award which paid in bitcoin of US$30,000.

Adesanya faced Alex Pereira, who had two victories against him in kickboxing, on 12 November 2022 at UFC 281. Adesanya lost the fight and title via technical knockout in the fifth round, his first loss at middleweight.

A rematch between Pereira and Adesanya for the UFC Middleweight Championship took place on 8 April 2023, at UFC 287. Adesanya won the fight and title via knockout in the second round. This win earned him the Performance of the Night award.

Adesanya faced Sean Strickland on 10 September 2023, at UFC 293. Adesanya lost the bout and championship in a major upset via unanimous decision, with all three judges scoring the fight 49–46.

Adesanya faced Dricus du Plessis for the UFC Middleweight Championship on 18 August 2024 at UFC 305 in Perth, Australia. He lost the fight via a face crank submission in the fourth round leading to the first submission loss in his career.

==== Post Championship ====
In his first non-title bout in over five years, Adesanya faced Nassourdine Imavov in the main event on 1 February 2025 at UFC Fight Night 250. He lost the fight by technical knockout in the second round.

On the UFC 312 broadcast in February 2025, it was announced that Adesanya's bout with Kelvin Gastelum at UFC 236 in April 2019 would be inducted into the fight wing of the 2025 UFC Hall of Fame.

Adesanya faced Joe Pyfer in the main event on 28 March 2026, at UFC Fight Night 271. He lost the fight by technical knockout in the second round.

Adesanya is scheduled to face Sharabutdin Magomedov on 5 December 2026 at UFC Fight Night 295.

== Professional boxing career ==
=== Prizefighting tournaments ===
Adesanya began his professional boxing career in November 2014 against two-time Australian champion Daniel Ammann. He was granted one of two wildcards to enter the inaugural cruiserweight Super 8 Boxing Tournament. The event was headlined by Shane Cameron and Kali Meehan at the North Shore Events Centre in Auckland, New Zealand. He suffered a controversial loss via unanimous decision after he looked to have outpointed Ammann in the quarter-finals.

Adesanya re-entered the Super 8 tournament in May 2015, held at Horncastle Arena in Christchurch. It was the second cruiserweight series with the winner receiving $25,000 NZD and a new car. He won his first professional fight against fellow New Zealander Asher Derbyshire in the first seed. Adesanya knocked his opponent out in the second round. In the second fight of the tournament, Adesanya won a majority decision against Lance Bryant. In the tournament final, he defeated Brian Minto by split decision.

Adesanya fought in the 2015 Super 8 Cruiserweight tournament. He won his semifinal match against Zane Hopman by unanimous decision, and defended the cruiserweight crown with a unanimous decision win against Lance Bryant in the final.

== Fighting style ==
Adesanya is primarily known as a striker, drawing on his background in kickboxing and Muay Thai. GLORY described his kickboxing style as flamboyant, noting his athletic kicking, frequent stance switching, low-hand posture and evasive countering. In mixed martial arts, his stand-up game has been described as being built around vision, distance and timing: he uses footwork to keep opponents at range, sets a measured tempo with jabs, teeps and kicks, and looks to counter as opponents enter.

A recurring feature of Adesanya's style is his use of feints. Analysts have noted his use of hand, shoulder and hip feints to draw defensive reactions, disguise straight punches and kicks, and create countering opportunities. He generally avoids extended pocket exchanges, preferring short punching combinations followed by kicks, exits, slips or rolls. His kicking arsenal has included low kicks, body kicks, front kicks and question-mark kicks, often set up by hip feints or stance switches.

In grappling exchanges, Adesanya's MMA game has generally been oriented toward keeping fights upright and in open space. SB Nation described him as a strong defensive wrestler, while UFC Stats records his official takedown-defense rate among his career statistics.

== Controversies ==
=== Referencing 9/11 attack ===
In February 2020, Adesanya came under fire for comments made at the UFC 248 pre-fight press conference, where he said he would make opponent Yoel Romero "crumble like the Twin Towers", referencing the September 11 attacks. The following day, Adesanya made an apology on his Instagram page, saying "I was simply rambling and my brain worked faster than my mouth in a moment to choose the wrong euphemism. You speak on the mic enough times and you're bound to miss the mark with some bars. I did on this one and for that I'm sorry. I'll be more careful in future with my words."

=== Derogatory sexual comment ===
On 25 March 2021, New Zealand Deputy Prime Minister and Minister of Sport, Grant Robertson, spoke out against Adesanya's "flippant comments" on his Instagram "Bro, I will fuckin' rape you" aimed at fellow UFC middleweight fighter, Kevin Holland. Robertson commented "I'm sure Israel understands that, I believe he has deleted the tweet in question. It will be up to the UFC as to what they do. But I would certainly be making clear to him [Adesanya], and to anybody actually, that we have to take rape seriously. It's not an issue that anyone should be making jokes or flippant comments about at all."

=== Brass knuckles possession arrest ===
On 16 November 2022, Adesanya was arrested at John F. Kennedy International Airport in New York City for the possession of brass knuckles.

=== Drunk driving ===
On 19 August 2023, Adesanya was pulled over for drunk driving in central Auckland, New Zealand where he was measured with blood alcohol content of 87mg%. In New Zealand the legal limit for driving is 50 mg%, and above 80 mg% the punishment is up to 3 months imprisonment. On 10 January 2024, he pleaded guilty and in lieu of a prison sentence, he was fined NZ$1,500 and given a six-month driving suspension. He was granted a discharge without conviction—his second, after previously driving while disqualified—due to the adverse effect a conviction would have on his ability to travel and acquire sponsorships. Additionally, after his court appearance he posted videos from inside the court to his social media pages, which is illegal in New Zealand without the permission of the presiding judge. He later removed the posts and released an apology.

=== Misinformation ===
On 1 August 2024, Adesanya made false comments on Twitter in regard to Algerian boxer Imane Khelif's win at the 2024 Summer Olympics, saying "Men should not be boxing women. lol he couldn't even finish her. Anyway, people > politics." He later apologized and said "From now on, I will leave women's fights to women. I tried to speak up about it and apparently, I got it wrong, a lot of people got it wrong, there was misinformation."

=== Road rage incident ===
On 5 September 2024, Adesanya was involved in a verbal confrontation with an individual after a road rage incident in Auckland, New Zealand, with Adesanya having been caught on video spitting in the direction of the man. In response to the incident, Adesanya expressed his disappointment about the nature of the incident in a statement, alleging that he was racially abused and will be looking to press charges against the individual.

== Personal life ==
Adesanya is multilingual, fluent in Yoruba, Nigerian Pidgin, and English.

Before taking up fighting, Adesanya regularly competed in dance competitions across New Zealand. He highlighted his passion for dance in a choreographed walkout at UFC 243.

Adesanya is a fan of anime and has stated he would like to start an anime production company after retiring from fighting. His nickname "The Last Stylebender" is a reference to Avatar: The Last Airbender, an anime-influenced cartoon series. Adesanya has the image of one of the show's main characters, Toph Beifong, tattooed on his forearm.

Adesanya is also a professional wrestling fan, once stopping mid interview when he spotted Booker T and acknowledged him.

In September 2020, he became the first mixed martial arts athlete to sign a sponsorship deal with Puma.

In June 2023, Stylebender, a documentary film focusing on the life of Adesanya debuted at the Tribeca Film Festival.

== Views and positions ==
Adesanya endorsed a "yes" vote in the 2020 New Zealand cannabis referendum.

In June 2021, Adesanya advocated tougher penalties against coward punching following the death of his training partner Fau Vake, who died after being punched in the head the previous month.

== Championships and accomplishments ==
=== Boxing ===
- Super 8 Boxing Tournament
  - Super 8 III Cruiserweight Champion (eight man tournament)
  - Super 8 IV Cruiserweight Champion (four man tournament)

=== Muay Thai ===
- World Muaythai Council
  - 2014 WMC Ocenia Cruiserweight Championship
- World Boxing Council Muay Thai
  - 2014 WBC Muay Thai International Cruiserweight Championship
- World Kickboxing Federation
  - 2011 WKBF Muay Thai New Zealand Cruiserweight Championship

=== Kickboxing ===
- King in the Ring
  - 2014 King in the Ring 86 kg II Champion (eight man tournament)
  - 2015 King in the Ring 86 kg III Champion (eight man tournament)
  - 2015 King in the Ring 100 kg II Champion (eight man tournament)
- Glory
  - 2016 Glory Middleweight Contender Tournament Winner (four man tournament)

Awards

- Combat Press
  - 2017 Fight of the Year (vs. Alex Pereira)

=== Mixed martial arts ===
- Ultimate Fighting Championship
  - UFC Hall of Fame (Fight Wing, Class of 2025) vs. Kelvin Gastelum at UFC 236
  - UFC Middleweight Championship (two times)
    - Five successful title defenses (first reign)
    - The first two-time UFC Middleweight champion
  - Interim UFC Middleweight Championship (one time)
    - Most knockdowns in a UFC title fight (4) vs Kelvin Gastelum
    - Second most title fight wins in UFC Middleweight division history (8) (behind Anderson Silva)
    - Second most knockdowns in UFC title fights (9)
  - Performance of the Night (Six times) vs. Rob Wilkinson, Brad Tavares, Derek Brunson, Robert Whittaker 1, Paulo Costa and Alex Pereira 2
  - Fight of the Night (two times) vs. Anderson Silva and Kelvin Gastelum
    - Tied (Yoel Romero) for the third most post-fight bonuses in UFC Middleweight division history (8)
  - Tied (Anderson Silva) for most knockdowns in UFC Middleweight division history (13)
  - Second longest winning streak in UFC Middleweight division history (12) (behind Anderson Silva)
  - Second longest average fight time in UFC Middleweight division history (16:43) (behind Sean Strickland)
  - Third most total fight time in UFC Middleweight division history (5:00:48)
  - Fifth most significant strikes landed in UFC Middleweight division history (1235)
    - Sixth most total strikes landed in UFC Middleweight division history (1438)
  - Quickest fighter in history to achieve their first eight UFC wins (755 days)
  - UFC Honors Awards
    - 2019: President's Choice Fight of the Year Winner vs. Kelvin Gastelum & President's Choice Performance of the Year Nominee vs. Robert Whittaker 1
    - 2023: Fan's Choice Knockout of the Year Winner vs. Alex Pereira 2 & President's Choice Performance of the Year Nominee vs. Alex Pereira 2
  - UFC.com Awards
    - 2018: Newcomer of the Year & Ranked #7 Fighter of the Year
    - 2019: Fight of the Year vs. Kelvin Gastelum & Top 10 Fighter of the Year
    - 2020: Ranked #10 Fighter of the Year
    - 2023: Half-Year Awards: Best Fighter of the 1HY, Half-Year Awards: Best Knockout of the 1HY & Ranked #2 Knockout of the Year vs. Alex Pereira 2
    - 2024: Ranked #10 Fight of the Year vs. Dricus Du Plessis
- Australian Fighting Championship
  - AFC Middleweight Champion (one time; former)
- Hex Fighting Series Middleweight
  - Hex Fighting Series Middleweight Champion (one time; former)
- MMA Junkie
  - 2018 Newcomer of the Year
  - 2019 Male Fighter of the Year
  - 2019 Fight of the Year vs. Kelvin Gastelum at UFC 236
  - 2019 April Fight of the Month vs. Kelvin Gastelum at UFC 236
  - 2023 Knockout of the Year vs. Alex Pereira 2 at UFC 287
  - 2023 April Knockout of the Month vs. Alex Pereira 2 at UFC 287
- MMA Fighting
  - 2018 Breakthrough Fighter of the Year
  - 2019 Fighter of the Year
  - 2019 Fight of the Year vs. Kelvin Gastelum at UFC 236
  - 2023 Knockout of the Year vs. Alex Pereira 2 at UFC 287
- The Sporting News
  - 2023 Knockout of the Year vs. Alex Pereira 2 at UFC 287
- New York Post
  - 2023 Knockout of the Year vs. Alex Pereira 2 at UFC 287
- Combat Press
  - 2018 Breakout Fighter of the Year
  - 2019 Male Fighter of the Year
  - 2019 Fight of the Year vs. Kelvin Gastelum at UFC 236
- Cageside Press
  - 2019 Male Fighter of the Year
  - 2019 Fight of the Year vs. Kelvin Gastelum at UFC 236
- Yahoo Sports
  - 2019 Fight of the Year vs. Kelvin Gastelum at UFC 236
- Bloody Elbow
  - 2019 Fight of the Year vs. Kelvin Gastelum at UFC 236
- MMA Sucka
  - 2018 UFC Breakout Star of the Year
  - 2019 Fighter of the Year
  - 2019 Fight of the Year vs. Kelvin Gastelum at UFC 236
- MMA Weekly
  - 2018 Breakout Fighter of the Year
- MMADNA.nl
  - 2018 Rising Star of the Year.
- The Body Lock
  - 2019 Fighter of the Year
- World MMA Awards
  - 2018 Breakthrough Fighter of the Year
  - 2019 – July 2020 Charles 'Mask' Lewis Fighter of the Year
  - 2019 – July 2020 International Fighter of the Year
  - 2021 International Fighter of the Year
- Voting period for 2019 awards ran from January 2019 to July 2020 due to the COVID-19 pandemic. Subsequently, the voting period for 2021 awards ran from July 2020 to July 2021.
- MMA Mania
  - 2019 Fighter of the Year
  - 2019 Fight of the Year vs. Kelvin Gastelum at UFC 236
- Halberg Awards
  - 2019 New Zealand Sportsman of the Year
- Wrestling Observer Newsletter
  - Mixed Martial Arts Most Valuable (2022)
  - Best Box Office Draw (2022)
  - Most Outstanding Fighter of the Year (2019, 2020)
  - MMA Match of the Year vs. Kelvin Gastelum at UFC 236
- LowKick MMA
  - 2019 Fight of the Year vs. Kelvin Gastelum at UFC 236
  - 2023 Knockout of the Year vs. Alex Pereira 2 at UFC 287
- ESPN
  - 2018 Breakout Fighter of the Year
  - 2019 Fight of the Year vs. Kelvin Gastelum at UFC 236
  - 2019 Walkout of the Year at UFC 243
  - 2020 Rivalry of the Year vs. Paulo Costa
  - 2023 Knockout of the Year vs. Alex Pereira 2 at UFC 287
- Bleacher Report
  - 2019 Fighter of the Year
  - 2019 Fight of the Year vs. Kelvin Gastelum at UFC 236
- CBS Sports
  - 2019 #2 Ranked UFC Fighter of the Year
  - 2019 UFC Fight of the Year vs. Kelvin Gastelum at UFC 236
  - 2020 #2 Ranked UFC Fighter of the Year
  - 2023 MMA Knockout of the Year vs. Alex Pereira 2 at UFC 287
- GiveMeSport
  - 2023 UFC Knockout of the Year vs. Alex Pereira 2 at UFC 287

== Pay-per-view bouts ==
No.	Event	Fight	Date	Venue	City	PPV buys
1.	UFC 234	Adesanya vs. Silva	10 February 2019	Rod Laver Arena	Melbourne, Australia	175,000
2.	UFC 243	Whittaker vs. Adesanya	8 October 2019	Marvel Stadium	Melbourne, Australia	Not disclosed
3.	UFC 248	Adesanya vs. Romero	7 March 2020	T-Mobile Arena	Las Vegas, Nevada, U.S.	Not disclosed
4.	UFC 253	Adesanya vs. Costa	27 September 2020	Flash Forum	Abu Dhabi, United Arab Emirates	700,000
5.	UFC 259	Błachowicz vs. Adesanya	6 March 2021	UFC Apex	Las Vegas, Nevada, U.S.	800,000
6.	UFC 263	Adesanya vs. Vettori 2	12 June 2021	Gila River Arena	Glendale, Arizona, U.S.	500,000
7.	UFC 271	Adesanya vs. Whittaker 2	12 February 2022	Toyota Center	Houston, Texas, U.S.	Not disclosed
8.	UFC 276	Adesanya vs. Cannonier	2 July 2022	T-Mobile Arena	Las Vegas, Nevada, U.S.	Not disclosed
9.	UFC 281	Adesanya vs. Pereira	12 November 2022	Madison Square Garden	New York City, New York, U.S.	Not disclosed
10.	UFC 287	Pereira vs. Adesanya 2	8 April 2023	Kaseya Center	Miami, Florida, U.S.	Not disclosed
11.	UFC 293	Adesanya vs. Strickland	10 September 2023	Qudos Bank Arena	Sydney, Australia	Not disclosed
12.	UFC 305	du Plessis vs. Adesanya	18 August 2024	RAC Arena	Perth, Australia	Not disclosed

== Mixed martial arts record ==
Professional record breakdown
30 matches	24 wins	6 losses
By knockout	16	3
By submission	0	1
By decision	8	2

Res.	Record	Opponent	Method	Event	Date	Round	Time	Location	Notes
Loss	24–6	Joe Pyfer	TKO (punches)	UFC Fight Night: Adesanya vs. Pyfer	28 March 2026	2	4:18	Seattle, Washington, United States	
Loss	24–5	Nassourdine Imavov	TKO (punches)	UFC Fight Night: Adesanya vs. Imavov	1 February 2025	2	0:30	Riyadh, Saudi Arabia	
Loss	24–4	Dricus du Plessis	Submission (face crank)	UFC 305	18 August 2024	4	3:38	Perth, Australia	For the UFC Middleweight Championship.
Loss	24–3	Sean Strickland	Decision (unanimous)	UFC 293	10 September 2023	5	5:00	Sydney, Australia	Lost the UFC Middleweight Championship.
Win	24–2	Alex Pereira	KO (punches)	UFC 287	8 April 2023	2	4:21	Miami, Florida, United States	Won the UFC Middleweight Championship. Performance of the Night.
Loss	23–2	Alex Pereira	TKO (punches)	UFC 281	12 November 2022	5	2:01	New York City, New York, United States	Lost the UFC Middleweight Championship.
Win	23–1	Jared Cannonier	Decision (unanimous)	UFC 276	2 July 2022	5	5:00	Las Vegas, Nevada, United States	Defended the UFC Middleweight Championship.
Win	22–1	Robert Whittaker	Decision (unanimous)	UFC 271	12 February 2022	5	5:00	Houston, Texas, United States	Defended the UFC Middleweight Championship.
Win	21–1	Marvin Vettori	Decision (unanimous)	UFC 263	12 June 2021	5	5:00	Glendale, Arizona, United States	Defended the UFC Middleweight Championship.
Loss	20–1	Jan Błachowicz	Decision (unanimous)	UFC 259	6 March 2021	5	5:00	Las Vegas, Nevada, United States	Light Heavyweight debut. For the UFC Light Heavyweight Championship.
Win	20–0	Paulo Costa	TKO (punches and elbows)	UFC 253	27 September 2020	2	3:59	Abu Dhabi, United Arab Emirates	Defended the UFC Middleweight Championship. Performance of the Night.
Win	19–0	Yoel Romero	Decision (unanimous)	UFC 248	7 March 2020	5	5:00	Las Vegas, Nevada, United States	Defended the UFC Middleweight Championship.
Win	18–0	Robert Whittaker	KO (punches)	UFC 243	6 October 2019	2	3:33	Melbourne, Australia	Won and unified the UFC Middleweight Championship. Performance of the Night.
Win	17–0	Kelvin Gastelum	Decision (unanimous)	UFC 236	13 April 2019	5	5:00	Atlanta, Georgia, United States	Won the interim UFC Middleweight Championship. Fight of the Night.
Win	16–0	Anderson Silva	Decision (unanimous)	UFC 234	10 February 2019	3	5:00	Melbourne, Australia	Fight of the Night.
Win	15–0	Derek Brunson	TKO (knees and punches)	UFC 230	3 November 2018	1	4:51	New York City, New York, United States	Performance of the Night.
Win	14–0	Brad Tavares	Decision (unanimous)	The Ultimate Fighter: Undefeated Finale	6 July 2018	5	5:00	Las Vegas, Nevada, United States	Performance of the Night.
Win	13–0	Marvin Vettori	Decision (split)	UFC on Fox: Poirier vs. Gaethje	14 April 2018	3	5:00	Glendale, Arizona, United States	
Win	12–0	Rob Wilkinson	TKO (knees and punches)	UFC 221	11 February 2018	2	3:37	Perth, Australia	Performance of the Night.
Win	11–0	Stuart Dare	KO (head kick)	Hex Fight Series 12	24 November 2017	1	4:53	Melbourne, Australia	Won the vacant HEX Middleweight Championship.
Win	10–0	Melvin Guillard	TKO (punches)	Australian FC 20	28 July 2017	1	4:49	Melbourne, Australia	Won the vacant AFC Middleweight Championship.
Win	9–0	Murad Kuramagomedov	TKO (punches)	WLF E.P.I.C. 4	28 May 2016	2	1:05	Henan, China	
Win	8–0	Andrew Flores Smith	TKO (corner stoppage)	Glory of Heroes 2	7 May 2016	1	5:00	Shenzhen, China	
Win	7–0	Dibir Zagirov	TKO (punches)	WLF E.P.I.C. 2	13 March 2016	2	2:23	Henan, China	
Win	6–0	Vladimir Katykhin	TKO (doctor stoppage)	WLF E.P.I.C. 1	13 January 2016	2	2:13	Henan, China	
Win	5–0	Gele Qing	TKO (elbows)	Wu Lin Feng 2015: New Zealand vs. China	19 September 2015	2	3:37	Auckland, New Zealand	
Win	4–0	Maui Tuigamala	TKO (kick to the body)	Fair Pay Fighting 1	5 September 2015	2	1:25	Auckland, New Zealand	
Win	3–0	Song Kenan	TKO (head kick)	The Legend of Emei 3	8 August 2015	1	1:59	Chengdu, China	Catchweight (187 lb) bout.
Win	2–0	John Vake	TKO (punches)	Shuriken MMA: Best of the Best	15 June 2013	1	4:43	Auckland, New Zealand	
Win	1–0	James Griffiths	TKO (punches)	Supremacy FC 9	24 March 2012	1	2:09	Auckland, New Zealand	Middleweight debut.

== Kickboxing and Muay Thai record ==
Professional Kickboxing and Muay Thai record
75 wins (27 (T)KOs), 5 losses, 0 draws
Date	Result	Opponent	Event	Location	Method	Round	Time
2017-03-04	Loss	(Brazil) Alex Pereira	Glory of Heroes 7	Sao Paulo, Brazil	KO (left hook)	3	0:42
2017-01-20	Loss	(Netherlands) Jason Wilnis	Glory 37: Los Angeles	Los Angeles, California, US	Decision (unanimous)	5	3:00
For the Glory Middleweight Championship.
2016-10-21	Win	(Netherlands) Yousri Belgaroui	Glory 34: Denver – Middleweight Contender Tournament Finals	Broomfield, Colorado, US	Decision (split)	3	3:00
Wins Glory 34: Denver – Middleweight Contender Tournament Championship.
2016-10-21	Win	(Canada) Robert Thomas	Glory 34: Denver – Middleweight Contender Tournament, Semi Finals	Broomfield, Colorado, US	Decision (unanimous)	3	3:00
2016-10-01	Win	(Romania) Bogdan Stoica	Glory of Heroes 5	Zhengzhou, China	KO (left mid kick)	2	1:45
2016-09-17	Win	(France) Romain Falendry	Rise of Heroes 1	Chaoyang, Liaoning, China	Decision (unanimous)	3	3:00
2016-08-06	Win	(Netherlands) Yousri Belgaroui	Glory of Heroes 4	Changzhi, China	Decision (unanimous)	3	3:00
2016-07-02	Win	(Belgium) Filip Verlinden	Glory of Heroes 3	Jiyuan, Henan, China	Decision (unanimous)	3	3:00
2016-06-25	Win	(Ukraine) Vitaly Kodin	Wu Lin Feng	China	Decision (unanimous)	3	3:00
2016-04-02	Loss	(Brazil) Alex Pereira	Glory of Heroes 1	Shenzhen, China	Decision (unanimous)	3	3:00
2016-01-30	Win	(Sweden) Carl N'Diaye	The Legend of Emei 7 – Wenjiang	Wenjiang, China	KO (left hook to the body)	1	3:00
2015-10-31	Win	(New Zealand) Jamie Eades	King in the Ring 100 – The Heavyweights III, Final	Auckland, New Zealand	Decision (unanimous)	3	3:00
Wins King in the Ring 100 – The Heavyweights III Tournament Championship.
2015-10-31	Win	(Australia) Dan Roberts	King in the Ring 100 – The Heavyweights III, Semi Finals	Auckland, New Zealand	KO (uppercut)	1	0:26
2015-10-31	Win	(Australia) Nase Foai	King in the Ring 100 – The Heavyweights III, Quarter Finals	Auckland, New Zealand	TKO (corner stoppage)	3	N/A
2015-04-11	Win	(New Zealand) Pati Afoa	King in the Ring 86 – The Cruiserweights III, Final	Auckland, New Zealand	KO (right cross)	1	0:52
Wins King in the Ring 86 – The Cruiserweights III Tournament Championship.
2015-04-11	Win	(Australia) Mark Timms	King in the Ring 86 – The Cruiserweights III, Semi Finals	Auckland, New Zealand	TKO (knee to the body)	2	N/A
2015-04-11	Win	(Australia) Kim Loudon	King in the Ring 86 – The Cruiserweights III, Quarter Finals	Auckland, New Zealand	TKO (referee stoppage)	3	
2015-02-14	Win	(Australia) Kim Loudon	Knees of Fury 50	Adelaide, Australia	TKO (retirement)	4	N/A
2014-10-25	Win	(Australia) Braid Jackson	Destiny Muay Thai 3	Brisbane, Australia	KO	2	
Wins the WBC Muay Thai International Cruiserweight title.
2014-10-11	Win	(United Kingdom) Joe Boobyer	Knees of Fury 48	Hamilton, New Zealand	KO (knee)		
2014-09-21	Win	(China) Wenjie Guo	Kungfu Union	Dalian, China	Decision	3	3:00
2014-08-30	Win	(New Zealand) Jamie Eades	King in the Ring 86 – The Cruiserweights II, Final	Auckland, New Zealand	KO (knee to the body)	1	1:08
Wins King in the Ring 86 – The Cruiserweights II Tournament title.
2014-08-30	Win	(New Zealand) Pati Afoa	King in the Ring 86 – The Cruiserweights II, Semi Finals	Auckland, New Zealand	KO (punches)	1	1:57
2014-08-30	Win	(Russia) Slava Alekseychik	King in the Ring 86 – The Cruiserweights II, Quarter Finals	Auckland, New Zealand	Decision (unanimous)	3	3:00
2014-05-24	Win	(New Zealand) Charles August	Knees of Fury 46	Adelaide, Australia	TKO (knee)	2	
Wins the WMC Oceania Cruiserweight title.
2014-04-12	Loss	(Belgium) Filip Verlinden	Glory 15: Istanbul	Istanbul, Turkey	Decision (unanimous)	3	3:00
2014-02-16	Loss	(Canada) Simon Marcus	Kunlun Fight 2 – 80kg tournament, Semi Finals	Zhengzhou, China	Ext. R decision (split)	4	3:00
2013-11-27	Win	(China) Qin Shan	Wu Lin Feng 2013	Anyang, China	TKO	3	N/A
2013-09-11	Win	(China) Nurla Mulali	Wu Lin Feng 2013	Kashi, China	Decision (unanimous)	3	3:00
2012-07-21	Win	(China) Niu Xiaoqiang	Wu Lin Feng 2012	Auckland, New Zealand	KO (punches)	3	N/A
2012-06-23	Win	(China) Xu Yi	Wu Lin Feng 2012	Foshan, China	Decision (unanimous)	3	3:00
2012-08-25	Win	(Australia) Gary Williams	Knees of Fury 38	Adelaide, Australia	Decision (split)	3	3:00
2012-05-26	Win	(Australia) Gary Williams	Knees of Fury 37	Adelaide, Australia	Decision (split)	3	3:00
2012-02-25	Win	(United Kingdom) Steve Behan	Knees of Fury 36	Adelaide, Australia	Decision (unanimous)	3	3:00
2011-09-24	Win	(China) Guo Qiang	CI-K	Kuala Lumpur, Malaysia	TKO (referee stoppage)	3	N/A
2011-06-11	Win	(China) Guo Qiang	Wu Lin Feng 2011	Shangqiu, China	Decision	3	3:00
2011-02-12	Win	(New Zealand) Eds Eramiha	Rumble in the Ville	Auckland, New Zealand	Decision (unanimous)	5	2:00
Wins the WKBF Muay Thai New Zealand Cruiserweight title.
2010-12-04	Win	(New Zealand) Eds Eramiha	Puma 8 Man Tournament	New Zealand	N/A	N/A	N/A
2010-12-04	Win	(New Zealand) Ti'i Nanai	Puma 8 Man Tournament	New Zealand	N/A	N/A	N/A
2010-12-04	Win	(New Zealand) Areta Gilbert	Puma 8 Man Tournament	New Zealand	N/A	N/A	N/A
2010-09-01	Win	(New Zealand) Zac Fatamaka	Auckland Fight Night 2010	Auckland, New Zealand	Decision	N/A	N/A
2010-07-17	Win	(New Zealand) Ben Davis	Lee Gar 35th Year Anniversary	New Zealand	N/A	N/A	N/A
2010-05-16	Win	(Australia) Tim Atonio	Fight Force	Melbourne, Australia	Decision (unanimous)	5	2:00
2010-04-23	Win	(New Zealand) Jerry Seagar	Bring the South to the City 3	New Zealand	N/A	N/A	N/A
Legend: Win Loss Draw/no contest Notes

== Professional boxing record ==
6 fights	5 wins	1 loss
By knockout	1	0
By decision	4	1

No.	Result	Record	Opponent	Type	Round, time	Date	Location	Notes
6	Win	5–1	Lance Bryant	UD	3	3 Nov 2015	SkyCity, Auckland, New Zealand	Super 8 Boxing Tournament IV: cruiserweight final
5	Win	4–1	Zane Hopman	UD	3	3 Nov 2015	SkyCity, Auckland, New Zealand	Super 8 Boxing Tournament IV: cruiserweight semi-final
4	Win	3–1	Brian Minto	SD	3	28 Mar 2015	Horncastle Arena, Christchurch, New Zealand	Super 8 Boxing Tournament III: cruiserweight final
3	Win	2–1	Lance Bryant	MD	3	28 Mar 2015	Horncastle Arena, Christchurch, New Zealand	Super 8 Boxing Tournament III: cruiserweight semi-final
2	Win	1–1	Asher Derbyshire	KO	2 (3)	28 Mar 2015	Horncastle Arena, Christchurch, New Zealand	Super 8 Boxing Tournament III: cruiserweight quarter-final
1	Loss	0–1	Daniel Ammann	UD	3	22 Nov 2014	North Shore Events Centre, Auckland, New Zealand	Super 8 Boxing Tournament II: cruiserweight quarter-final

== See also ==
- List of current UFC fighters
- List of male boxers
- List of male kickboxers
- List of male mixed martial artists
- List of mixed martial artists with professional boxing records
- List of multi-sport athletes
- List of prizefighters with professional boxing and kickboxing records

Sporting positions
Mixed martial arts titles
Vacant Title last held by Robert Whittaker	2nd UFC Interim Middleweight Champion; 13 April 2019 – 6 October 2019	Vacant
Preceded by Robert Whittaker	11th UFC Middleweight Champion; 6 October 2019 – 12 November 2022	Succeeded by Alex Pereira
Preceded by Alex Pereira	13th UFC Middleweight Champion; 8 April 2023 – 10 September 2023	Succeeded by Sean Strickland
Kickboxing titles
Preceded by TY Williams	2nd King in the Ring Cruiserweight Champion; 30 August 2014 – 11 April 2015; Vacated	Vacant
Vacant	3rd King in the Ring Cruiserweight Champion; 11 April 2015 – 17 November 2017; Vacated	Succeeded by Slava Alexeichik
Preceded by Antz Nansen	3rd King in the Ring Heavyweight Champion; 31 October 2015 – 30 June 2017; Vacated	Succeeded by Carlos Ulberg
Boxing titles
Preceded by Brad Pitt	1st Super 8 Boxing Cruiserweight Champion; 28 March 2015	Incumbent
Preceded by Israel Adesanya	2nd Super 8 Boxing Cruiserweight Champion; 3 November 2015	Incumbent
Awards
Preceded by Brian Ortega	World MMA Breakthrough of the Year; 2018	Succeeded by Jorge Masvidal
Preceded by Tom Walsh	New Zealand's Sportsman of the Year; 2019	Succeeded by Kane Williamson
Preceded by Daniel Cormier	World MMA Fighter of the Year; 2019–20	Succeeded by Kamaru Usman
