= Thamsanqa =

- Pronunciation: [ˈtʰamsaᵑǃa]
- Gender: Male

Origin
- Origin: Xhosa
- Meaning: Blessing(s), fortune or luck

Other names
- Related names: Nomathamsanqa (Female)

Thamsanqa is a given name, from the Xhosa word meaning 'blessing(s)' 'fortune' or 'luck'. Notable people with the name include:

- Thamsanqa Dube, Zimbabwean boxer
- Thamsanga Mnyele (1948–1985), South African artist and anti-apartheid activist
- Thamsanqa Shabalala (born 1977), South African singer
- Thamsanqa Gabuza (born 1987), South African soccer player
