= Shane Cameron =

New Zealand boxer

Personal information
- Nickname: The Mountain Warrior
- Nationality: New Zealander
- Born: Shane Aaron Cameron; 17 October 1977 (age 49) Tiniroto, New Zealand
- Height: 1.88 m (6 ft 2 in)
- Weight: Cruiserweight; Heavyweight

Boxing career
- Reach: 187 cm (74 in)
- Stance: Orthodox

Boxing record
- Total fights: 34
- Wins: 29
- Win by KO: 22
- Losses: 5
Medal record
Representing New Zealand
Men's boxing
Commonwealth Games
Bronze medal – third place	2002 Manchester	Heavyweight

Shane Aaron Cameron (born 17 October 1977) is a New Zealand professional boxer. He is a former Commonwealth cruiserweight champion, having also held several regional titles at heavyweight. As an amateur he won a bronze medal in the heavyweight division at the 2002 Commonwealth Games. Outside of boxing, he placed fifth in the 2015 series of Dancing With the Stars New Zealand.

== Amateur career ==
He beat Adam Forsyth for the 2001 New Zealand heavyweight crown and lost to Jason Douglas in the semi-finals of the 91 kg Commonwealth Games, winning a bronze medal. He finished his amateur career with the record of 40–8.

== Professional career ==
Cameron made his professional debut on 28 November 2002, with a third-round knockout victory over Winston Palu in the Auckland suburb of Kohimarama. He defeated Shane Wijohn on 4 December 2004 in Auckland to win the New Zealand Heavyweight title, which he would later vacate in order to pursue international titles.

On 28 July 2006 in Auckland, Cameron added two more championships to his record, with a 10th-round technical knockout of Roger Izonritei. With that win, he captured the vacant WBA Pan African Heavyweight title, as well as Izonritei's International Boxing Federation (IBF) Pan Pacific title.

In October 2006, ranked 14th worldwide by the IBF, he was for the first time ranked ahead of fellow countryman and world heavyweight title contender David Tua. Cameron formally challenged Tua, declaring: "David Tua said on television a while back 'Shane who?' but if he looks at who is ranked, I am, he's not, so he knows who I am now: and if he gets in the ring with me, he will know."

In December 2006, Cameron enjoyed his 17th consecutive victory as a professional, via a 9th round TKO of South African Osborne Machimana in Christchurch, thus retaining his WBA Pan African heavyweight title.

After the fight Cameron once again called for a match with Tua. However Tua's adviser Inga Tuigamala responded: "I know Shane Cameron has been banging the drum and wants to get it on with David, but from David's perspective, Shane is still on his way up the ladder and at the moment a fight between them would be of more benefit to Shane than David."

On 7 March 2007 Cameron fought Australian boxing veteran Bob Mirovic in an Anthony Mundine undercard fight at the Sydney Entertainment Centre. Despite breaking his right hand in the first round and suffering cuts above both eyes, Cameron knocked Mirovic out in the eighth round via a left hook to the Australian's forehead to again retain his WBA Pan African title.

Once again a challenge was extended to Tua, with Cameron's camp offering the fellow Kiwi NZ$250,000 to step into the ring. After the match Cameron's New Zealand manager Ken Reinsfield stated "We'd fight Tua in a heartbeat, but you can see why Tua doesn't want to fight him."

Cameron added a third title to his collection on 28 June 2007, with a first-round TKO win over a jet-lagged Brazilian Jucimar Hipolito for the vacant World Boxing Organization Asia Pacific Heavyweight title. Jucimar was a late replacement to Kelvin Davis who broke his back after jumping off a bridge to avoid a car in a night time training run.

On 2 November 2007, Cameron suffered his first professional defeat at the hands of Friday Ahunanya. Cameron lost by a 12th round TKO decision after he was sent to the canvas twice after Ahunanya opened up bleeding cuts above Cameron's eyes. With this loss, Cameron surrendered all the titles he previously held. Cuts to both eyes hampered his vision (cut right eye in round 3, cut left eye in round 9) and ability to avoid punches from his opponent in the later rounds. Even heading into round 12, according to commentators, he was leading on points. Cameron's management still had high hopes for his future and stated that they would allow three months for the cuts to heal properly before his next fight.

On 11 April 2008 Cameron fought American Heavyweight Jonathan Haggler, Haggler's record being 18 wins and 2 losses. Cameron knocked out Haggler in the eighth round. Winning the fight meant Cameron claimed the WBO Oriental, WBO Asia-Pacific and IBF Pan-Pacific belts. He bled only slightly from above his left eyebrow, which had been recently operated on.

Cameron then fought American Kevin Montiy on 28 June 2008 knocking him out in the 5th round. With that win Cameron defended his IBF Pan Pacific heavyweight title and his WBO Oriental heavyweight title. Cameron later stated "The Montiy fight was one of my best performances to date. I had my best camp, great sparring and my conditioning was great as always".

A fight between David Tua and Shane Cameron took place in Hamilton, New Zealand on 3 October 2009. The fight was dubbed "The Fight of The Century" by promoters John McRae and David Higgins, both boxers were guaranteed $500,000 in prize money with the winner expected to get a win bonus. Despite the hype, the fight was one-sided. Tua knocked Cameron down twice in the first round, with a series of trademark left hooks. Due to an adjudicating error, Cameron was not counted out and survived to the end of the round. However, Tua exploded onto him in the first 7 seconds of the second round, backing Cameron up onto the ropes before throwing nearly 20 punches (most of which cleanly connected) to Cameron's head. As Cameron sank to the canvas, the referee stepped in to stop the fight. Losing meant Cameron surrendered his IBF Pan-Pacific, WBO Oriental and WBO Asia-Pacific belts.

Cameron defeated John Hopoate via disqualification in Melbourne, Australia, on 18 March 2010. The fight ended 43 seconds into the second round of a scheduled 10 round bout. Cameron followed up this with unanimous decision victories against Daniel Ammann and Anthony McCracken. The latter served as a final eliminator for the commonwealth cruiserweight title which Cameron fought for in his next bout against Dominic Vea. The bout took place on 20 July 2011 on the undercard of the Danny Green vs Antonio Tarver IBO cruiserweight title fight, and saw Cameron become the new commonwealth champion when he knocked out Vea in round 12.

Cameron fought Monte Barrett on 5 July 2012 for NZPBA title eliminator match (The winner would likely face Sonny Bill Williams). Three days before the fight, Cameron said his preparation for the Barrett fight had been "superb" and he was feeling good about it. He knocked out Barrett in the 4th round with an overhand right. With the win Cameron redeemed his loss to David Tua and accepted a challenge from Danny Green for the vacant IBO Cruiserweight title to be held on 21 November in Melbourne, Australia.

He lost to Danny Green by unanimous points decision in Melbourne on 21 November 2012.

== Professional boxing record ==
34 fights	29 wins	5 losses
By knockout	22	3
By decision	6	2
By disqualification	1	0

No.	Result	Record	Opponent	Type	Round, time	Date	Location	Notes
34	Loss	29–5	Kali Meehan	UD	10	22 Nov 2014	North Shore Events Centre, Auckland, New Zealand	For vacant WBA Pan-African heavyweight title
33	Loss	29–4	Brian Minto	RTD	7 (12), 3:00	14 Dec 2013	The Trusts Arena, Auckland, New Zealand	For vacant WBO Oriental heavyweight title
32	Loss	29–3	Danny Green	UD	12	21 Nov 2012	Hisense Arena, Melbourne, Australia	For vacant IBO cruiserweight title
31	Win	29–2	Monte Barrett	KO	4 (12), 0:18	5 Jul 2012	SkyCity Convention Centre, Auckland, New Zealand	Won WBO Asia-Pacific and WBO Oriental heavyweight titles
30	Win	28–2	Monty Betham	UD	6	3 Dec 2011	The Trusts Arena, Auckland, New Zealand	
29	Win	27–2	Dominic Vea	KO	12 (12), 1:37	20 Jul 2011	Entertainment Centre, Sydney, Australia	Won Commonwealth cruiserweight title
28	Win	26–2	Anthony McCracken	UD	12	17 Nov 2010	Challenge Stadium, Perth, Australia	Won vacant IBO Asia-Pacific cruiserweight title
27	Win	25–2	Daniel Ammann	UD	10	21 Jul 2010	Challenge Stadium, Perth, Australia	
26	Win	24–2	John Hopoate	DQ	2 (12), 0:43	18 Mar 2010	Flemington Racecourse, Melbourne, Australia	
25	Loss	23–2	David Tua	KO	2 (12), 0:16	3 Oct 2009	Mystery Creek Events Centre, Hamilton, New Zealand	Lost WBO Asia-Pacific and WBO Oriental heavyweight titles
24	Win	23–1	Robert Davis	TKO	11 (12)	7 Mar 2009	Rugby Park, Gisborne, New Zealand	Retained IBF Pan-Pacific heavyweight title
23	Win	22–1	Terry Smith	UD	12	27 Sep 2008	Town Hall, Christchurch, New Zealand	Retained WBO Asia-Pacific and WBO Oriental heavyweight titles
22	Win	21–1	Kevin Montiy	TKO	5 (12), 2:12	28 Jul 2008	TSB Bank Arena, Wellington, New Zealand	Retained IBF Pan-Pacific and WBO Oriental heavyweight titles
21	Win	20–1	Jonathan Haggler	KO	7 (12), 2:55	11 Apr 2008	SkyCity Convention Centre, Auckland, New Zealand	Won interim WBO Asia-Pacific and vacant WBO Oriental heavyweight titles; Retained IBF Pan-Pacific heavyweight title
20	Loss	19–1	Friday Ahunanya	TKO	12 (12), 2:14	2 Nov 2007	SkyCity Convention Centre, Auckland, New Zealand	For vacant PABA and interim WBA NABA heavyweight titles; Lost WBO Asia-Pacific heavyweight title
19	Win	19–0	Jucimar Francisco Hipólito	TKO	1 (12)	28 Jun 2007	The Trusts Arena, Auckland, New Zealand	Won vacant WBO Asia-Pacific heavyweight title; Retained IBF Pan-Pacific and WBA Pan-African heavyweight titles
18	Win	18–0	Bob Mirovic	KO	8 (12), 2:50	7 Mar 2007	Entertainment Centre, Sydney	Retained WBA Pan-African heavyweight title
17	Win	17–0	Osborne Machimana	TKO	9 (12)	1 Dec 2006	Cowles Stadium, Christchurch, New Zealand	Retained IBF Pan-Pacific and WBA Pan-African heavyweight titles
16	Win	16–0	Roger Izonritei	TKO	10 (12)	28 Jul 2006	ABA Stadium, Auckland, New Zealand	Won IBF Pan-Pacific and vacant WBA Pan-African heavyweight titles
15	Win	15–0	Hiriwa Te Rangi	TKO	2 (8), 1:45	27 May 2006	The Centre, Kerikeri, New Zealand	
14	Win	14–0	James Walton	MD	10	5 Nov 2005	Caesars Tahoe, Stateline, Nevada, U.S.	
13	Win	13–0	Adele Olakanye	TKO	4 (8), 0:51	1 Oct 2005	Events Center, Reno, Nevada, U.S.	
12	Win	12–0	Colin Wilson	TKO	7 (12)	29 Apr 2005	ASB Stadium, Auckland, New Zealand	Won vacant Australasian heavyweight title
11	Win	11–0	Auckland Auimatagi	TKO	2 (10), 2:23	4 Mar 2005	Civic Centre, Feilding, New Zealand	Retained NZPBA heavyweight title
10	Win	10–0	Shane Wijohn	TKO	4 (12), 0:42	4 Dec 2004	SkyCity Convention Centre, Auckland, New Zealand	Won vacant NZPBA heavyweight title
9	Win	9–0	Richard Tutaki	KO	3 (8)	30 Sep 2004	ABA Stadium, Auckland, New Zealand	
8	Win	8–0	Hiriwa Te Rangi	UD	8	23 Jul 2004	Civic Centre, Feilding, New Zealand	
7	Win	7–0	Gilberto Melo	TKO	4 (6)	5 Jun 2004	SkyCity Convention Centre, Auckland, New Zealand	
6	Win	6–0	Richard Kemp	TKO	2 (6), 2:53	19 Jan 2004	Entertainment Centre, Wollongong, Australia	
5	Win	5–0	Shane Norford	TKO	2 (6)	13 Nov 2003	Westrust Centre, Christchurch, New Zealand	
4	Win	4–0	Vernon Woodward	TKO	1 (4), 2:40	12 Jul 2003	Caesars Tahoe, Stateline, Nevada, U.S.	
3	Win	3–0	Jeff Lindsey	TKO	1 (4), 0:46	7 Jun 2003	Flamingo Hilton, Laughlin, Nevada, U.S.	
2	Win	2–0	Alphonzo Davis	KO	2 (4), 2:59	24 May 2003	Hilton Casino Resort, Reno, Nevada, U.S.	
1	Win	1–0	Winston Palu	KO	3 (4)	28 Nov 2002	ABA Stadium, Auckland, New Zealand	

== Filmography ==
Films
Year	Title	Role	Notes
2011	Tender	Himself	Short film
Television series
Year	Series	Role	Notes
2006	Pulp Sport	Himself	
2008	Shortland Street	Himself	Cameo appearance
2009	Code	Himself	
2009	Close Up	Himself	
	Country Calendar	Himself	Documentary
	SportsCafe	Himself	
	Game of Two-Halves	Himself	
2015	Jono and Ben	Himself	
2015	Dancing with the Stars	Himself	

== Awards and recognitions ==
- 2019 Gladrap Boxing Hall of fame
- 2019 Gladrap Boxing Awards Promoter of the year (Won)
- 2019 Gladrap Boxing Awards Trainer of the year (Nominated)
- 2019 Gladrap Boxing Awards Event of the year (Nominated)

Sporting positions
Regional boxing titles
Vacant Title last held by Fonomanu Sekona	NZPBA heavyweight champion 4 December 2004 – 8 February 2012; Vacated	Vacant Title next held by Sonny Bill Williams
Vacant Title last held by Craig Petersen	Australasian heavyweight champion 29 April 2005 – 22 November 2014; Vacated	Incumbent
Preceded by Roger Izonritei	IBF Pan-Pacific heavyweight champion 28 July 2006 – 2 September 2010; Vacated	Vacant Title next held by Kali Meehan
New title	WBA Pan-African heavyweight champion 28 July 2006 – 2 April 2009; Vacated	Vacant Title next held by Thamsanqa Dube
Vacant Title last held by Dennis Bakhtov	WBO Asia-Pacific heavyweight champion 28 June 2007 – 2 November 2007	Succeeded by Friday Ahunanya
Vacant Title last held by Friday Ahunanya	WBO Asia-Pacific heavyweight champion 11 April 2008 – 3 October 2009	Succeeded by David Tua
New title	WBO Oriental heavyweight champion 11 April 2008 – 3 October 2009	Succeeded by David Tua
New title	IBO Asia-Pacific cruiserweight champion 17 November 2010 – 18 November 2011; Vacated	Vacant Title next held by Brad Pitt
Preceded by Dominic Vea	Commonwealth cruiserweight champion 20 July 2011 – 22 February 2014; Vacated	Vacant Title next held by Tony Conquest
Preceded by Monte Barrett	WBO Asia-Pacific heavyweight champion 5 July 2012 – 21 December 2012; Vacated	Vacant Title next held by Alex Leapai
Preceded by Monte Barrett	WBO Oriental heavyweight champion 5 July 2012 – 21 December 2012; Vacated	Vacant Title next held by Alex Leapai
