= Mohamed Azzaoui =

Algerian boxer (born 1975)

Personal information
- Born: December 1, 1975 (age 50) Mostaganem, Algeria
Medal record
Men's boxing
Representing Algeria
All-Africa Games
Gold medal – first place	1999 Johannesburg	Heavyweight

Mohamed Azzaoui (born December 1, 1975, in Mostaganem) is a retired amateur boxer from Algeria, who is best known for winning the gold medal in the men's heavyweight division (– 91 kg) at the 1999 All-Africa Games in Johannesburg, South Africa. He represented his native country at the 2000 Summer Olympics in Sydney, Australia, where he was defeated in the first round by Jackson Chanet from France. He is also a former New Zealand and Pan Asian Boxing Association cruiserweight champion.

== Career ==
- participant Olympic Games 2000 ( Sydney, Australia ) (– 91 kg)
- (gold) African Amateur Boxing Championships 1998 ( Algiers, Algeria ) (+91 kg)
- (gold) All-Africa Games 1999 ( Johannesburg, South Africa) (– 91 kg)
- (gold) Pan Arab Games 1999 (Amman, Jordan) (– 91 kg)

=== International tournaments ===
- (gold) Copengahen Cup - 1999 (– 91 kg)
- (silver) Giraldo Cordova Cardin Tournament ( Santa Clara, Cuba) 1999 (– 91 kg)
- (bronze) Giraldo Cordova Cardin Tournament (Havana, Cuba ) 1998 (– 91 kg)

== Professional boxing record ==
37 fights	26 wins	8 losses
By knockout	8	5
By decision	17	3
By disqualification	1	0
Draws	3	

No.	Result	Record	Opponent	Type	Round, time	Date	Location	Notes
37	Loss	26–8–3	Arsen Goulamirian	TKO	1 (8)	3 Jul 2015	Salle de Mouzon, Auch, France	
36	Loss	26–7–3	Noel Mikaelian	KO	5 (8), 2:07	25 Apr 2015	Columbiahalle, Berlin, Germany	
35	Loss	26–6–3	Vaitele Soi	MD	3	7 May 2011	ASB Stadium, Auckland, New Zealand	New Zealand 2011 cruiserweight tournament - semi-final
34	Win	26–5–3	Abdul Rasheed Baloch	UD	3	7 May 2011	ASB Stadium, Auckland, New Zealand	New Zealand 2011 cruiserweight tournament - quarter-final
33	Draw	25–5–3	Anthony McCracken	TD	1 (12), 2:50	1 Apr 2011	Bolton Park Sports Stadium, Wagga Wagga, Australia	For vacant WBA-PABA cruiserweight title; Azzaoui accidentally hit in the back of head, doctor ruled him unfit to continue
32	Win	25–5–2	Moyoyo Mensah	DQ	7 (12)	28 Aug 2009	ASB Stadium, Auckland, New Zealand	Won vacant WBO Africa cruiserweight title; Mensah continued to punch when ordered to break & stand back
31	Win	24–5–2	Junior Pati	UD	4	25 Jul 2009	Whangārei, New Zealand	
30	Loss	23–5–2	Daniel Ammann	UD	6	16 May 2009	Cardiff Panthers, Cardiff, Australia	
29	Loss	23–4–2	Jamie Withers	UD	6	12 Nov 2008	E.G. Whitlam Recreation Center, Liverpool, Australia	
28	Loss	23–3–2	Alex Leapai	KO	2 (8), 1:11	1 Aug 2008	Brisbane Convention & Exhibition Centre, Brisbane, Australia	
27	Win	23–2–2	Amosa Zinck	UD	4	13 May 2008	Leisure Centre, Auckland, New Zealand	
26	Loss	22–2–2	Yoan Pablo Hernández	KO	1 (12), 2:08	29 Dec 2007	Seidensticker Halle, Bielefeld, Germany	For WBA Fedelatin and vacant WBC Latino cruiserweight titles
25	Loss	22–1–2	Enzo Maccarinelli	TKO	4 (12), 0:58	3 Nov 2007	Principality Stadium, Cardiff, Wales	For WBO cruiserweight title
24	Win	22–0–2	Henry Saenz	RTD	8 (12), 3:00	13 Oct 2007	Khodynka Ice Palace, Moscow, Russia	Retained IBF Pan Pacific cruiserweight title
23	Win	21–0–2	Derrick Whitley	UD	12	8 Jun 2007	Sky City Convention Centre, Auckland, New Zealand	Retained WBA-PABA and IBF Pan Pacific cruiserweight titles
22	Win	20–0–2	Nermin Sabanović	UD	12	6 May 2007	The Palace, St Kilda, Melbourne, Australia	Retained WBA-PABA cruiserweight title; Won vacant IBF Pan Pacific and WBF (Foundation) Asia Pacific cruiserweight titles
21	Win	19–0–2	Alapati Kitiona	KO	2 (12), 2:30	24 Mar 2007	PIA Stadium, Pukekohe, New Zealand	Retained WBA-PABA cruiserweight title
20	Win	18–0–2	Moyoyo Mensah	UD	12	22 Sep 2006	ABA Stadium, Auckland, New Zealand	Retained WBA-PABA cruiserweight title
19	Win	17–0–2	James Ellis	UD	8	28 Jul 2006	ABA Stadium, Auckland, New Zealand	
18	Win	16–0–2	Sean Sullivan	UD	12	27 May 2006	The Center, Kerikeri, New Zealand	Retained WBA-PABA cruiserweight title
17	Win	15–0–2	Costa Chondros	UD	6	1 Apr 2006	ABA Stadium, Auckland, New Zealand	
16	Win	14–0–2	Brett Smith	TKO	5 (12), 0:37	7 May 2005	St Marys Band Club, St Marys, Australia	Retained WBA-PABA cruiserweight title
15	Win	13–0–2	Seiaute Ma'ilata	UD	12	27 Mar 2004	Forum North, Whangārei, New Zealand	Won vacant WBA-PABA cruiserweight title
14	Win	12–0–2	Joe Davies	KO	4 (6)	28 Feb 2004	The Boxeur, Kaikohe, New Zealand	
13	Win	11–0–2	Lightning Lupe	UD	4	32 Jan 2004	War Memorial Hall, Kaikohe, New Zealand	
12	Draw	10–0–2	Kariz Kariuki	PTS	12	4 Oct 2003	Forum North, Whangārei, New Zealand	
11	Win	10–0–1	Terry Tuteru	UD	8	13 Sep 2003	Northland Town Hall, Dargaville, New Zealand	
10	Win	9–0–1	Bob Gasio	UD	6	21 Jun 2003	Alexandra Park Raceway, Auckland, New Zealand	
9	Win	8–0–1	Richard Tutaki	KO	3 (10)	13 Jun 2003	Northland College, Kaikohe, New Zealand	
8	Draw	7–0–1	Terry Tuteru	PTS	6	13 Apr 2003	The Sonic Bar, Manukau City, New Zealand	
7	Win	7–0	Bob Gasio	KO	3 (12)	22 Feb 2003	Northland College Hall, Kaikohe, New Zealand	Won vacant NZNBF cruiserweight title
6	Win	6–0	Vernon Downes	UD	4	1 Feb 2003	ASB Stadium, Auckland, New Zealand	
5	Win	5–0	Leon Brown	KO	1 (4)	14 Dec 2002	YMCA Stadium, Tokoroa, New Zealand	
4	Win	4–0	Aisea Nama	TKO	3 (6)	7 Dec 2002	YMCA Stadium, Auckland, New Zealand	
3	Win	3–0	Apa Nanai	PTS	6	11 Nov 2001	Melbourne, Australia	
2	Win	2–0	Martin Opetaia	PTS	6	25 May 2001	Southport RSL Club, Gold Coast, Australia	
1	Win	1–0	Mark Alexander	PTS	4	9 Mar 2001	Southport RSL Club, Gold Coast, Australia	
