= UFC 236 =

UFC mixed martial arts event in 2019

UFC 236: Holloway vs. Poirier 2
- The poster for UFC 236: Holloway vs. Poirier 2
- Promotion: Ultimate Fighting Championship
- Date: April 13, 2019
- Venue: State Farm Arena
- City: Atlanta, Georgia
- Attendance: 14,297
- Total gate: $1,900,000

Event chronology
UFC on ESPN: Barboza vs. Gaethje	UFC 236: Holloway vs. Poirier 2	UFC Fight Night: Overeem vs. Oleinik

UFC 236: Holloway vs. Poirier 2 was a mixed martial arts event produced by the Ultimate Fighting Championship held on April 13, 2019 at the State Farm Arena in Atlanta, Georgia.

== Background ==
In the United States, per an extension of its new rights agreements with ESPN through 2025, ESPN+ became the exclusive distributor of UFC pay-per-views for residential customers beginning at UFC 236: viewers must have an active ESPN+ subscription in order to purchase and stream PPV events, and they can no longer be purchased through other outlets (such as television providers). At the same time, the price of the PPV was lowered from $64.99 to $59.99, and a promotional offer was launched allowing new subscribers to purchase a bundle of the PPV and a one-year subscription to ESPN+ for $20 more.

The event was headlined by an interim UFC Lightweight Championship bout between the then reigning UFC Featherweight Champion Max Holloway and Dustin Poirier. The two previously met in a featherweight bout at UFC 143 where Poirier won by submission in the first round.

An interim UFC Middleweight Championship bout between The Ultimate Fighter: Team Jones vs. Team Sonnen middleweight winner Kelvin Gastelum and former Glory Kickboxing middleweight champion Israel Adesanya served as the co-main event.

A bantamweight bout between Boston Salmon and Khalid Taha was initially scheduled for The Ultimate Fighter: Heavy Hitters Finale. However, the pairing was removed from the card for undisclosed reasons and instead took place at this event.

Paige VanZant was briefly linked to a match-up with Poliana Botelho at the event. However, just days after the pairing was leaked, VanZant announced that she would not be competing on the card due to a fractured right arm. VanZant was replaced by Lauren Mueller.

== Results ==
Main Card
Weight class				Method	Round	Time	Notes
Lightweight	Dustin Poirier	def.	Max Holloway	Decision (unanimous) (49–46, 49–46, 49–46)	5	5:00	(Note: For the interim UFC Lightweight Championship.)
Middleweight	Israel Adesanya	def.	Kelvin Gastelum	Decision (unanimous) (48–46, 48–46, 48–46)	5	5:00	(Note: For the interim UFC Middleweight Championship.)
Light Heavyweight	Khalil Rountree Jr.	def.	Eryk Anders	Decision (unanimous) (30–26, 30–26, 30–26)	3	5:00
Welterweight	Dwight Grant	def.	Alan Jouban	Decision (split) (29–28, 27–30, 29–28)	3	5:00
Light Heavyweight	Nikita Krylov	def.	Ovince Saint Preux	Submission (rear-naked choke)	2	2:30
Preliminary Card (ESPN)
Lightweight	Matt Frevola	def.	Jalin Turner	Decision (unanimous) (30–27, 30–27, 30–27)	3	5:00
Flyweight	Alexandre Pantoja	def.	Wilson Reis	TKO (punches)	1	2:58
Welterweight	Max Griffin	def.	Zelim Imadaev	Decision (majority) (29–27, 29–27, 28–28)	3	5:00	(Note: Imadaev was deducted a point in round 1 for grabbing the cage.)
Bantamweight	Khalid Taha	def.	Boston Salmon	TKO (punches)	1	0:25
Early Preliminary Card (UFC Fight Pass)
Welterweight	Belal Muhammad	def.	Curtis Millender	Decision (unanimous) (29–27, 29–27, 30–26)	3	5:00
Bantamweight	Montel Jackson	def.	Andre Soukhamthath	Decision (unanimous) (30–26, 30–27, 29–27)	3	5:00
Women's Flyweight	Poliana Botelho	def.	Lauren Mueller	Decision (unanimous) (29–28, 29–28, 29–28)	3	5:00
Bantamweight	Brandon Davis	def.	Randy Costa	Submission (rear-naked choke)	2	1:12

== Bonus awards ==
The following fighters were awarded $50,000 bonuses:

- Fight of the Night: Dustin Poirier vs. Max Holloway and Kelvin Gastelum vs. Israel Adesanya
- Performance of the Night: No bonus awarded.

== Reported payout ==
The following is the reported payout to the fighters as reported to the Georgia Athletic and Entertainment Commission. It does not include sponsor money and also does not include the UFC's traditional "fight night" bonuses. The total disclosed payroll for the event was $1,972,000.

- Dustin Poirier: $250,000 (no win bonus) def. Max Holloway: $350,000
- Israel Adesanya: $350,000 (no win bonus) def. Kelvin Gastelum: $150,000
- Khalil Rountree Jr.: $70,000 (includes $35,000 win bonus) def. Eryk Anders: $50,000
- Dwight Grant: $24,000 (includes $12,000 win bonus) def. Alan Jouban: $43,000
- Nikita Krylov: $160,000 (includes $80,000 win bonus) def. Ovince Saint Preux: $86,000
- Matt Frevola: $20,000 (includes $10,000 win bonus) def. Jalin Turner: $12,000
- Alexandre Pantoja: $36,000 (includes $18,000 win bonus) def. Wilson Reis: $34,000
- Max Griffin: $40,000 (includes $20,000 win bonus) def. Zelim Imadaev: $10,000
- Khalid Taha: $20,000 (includes $10,000 win bonus) def. Boston Salmon: $10,000
- Belal Muhammad: $70,000 (includes $35,000 win bonus) def. Curtis Millender: $31,000
- Montel Jackson: $24,000 (includes $12,000 win bonus) def. Andre Soukhamthath: $22,000
- Poliana Botelho: $50,000 (includes $25,000 win bonus) def. Lauren Mueller: $12,000
- Brandon Davis: $36,000 (includes $18,000 win bonus) def. Randy Costa: $12,000

== See also ==
- List of UFC events
- 2019 in UFC
- List of current UFC fighters
