= Daniel Ammann (boxer) =

Australian boxer (born 1982)

- Born: 15 December 1982 (age 43); Wagga Wagga, New South Wales, Australia
- Height: 180 cm (5 ft 11 in)
- Weight: 196 lb (89 kg; 14 st 0 lb)
- Division: Cruiserweight
- Reach: 182 cm (72 in)
- Stance: Southpaw
- Years active: 2005–2017

Professional boxing record
- Total: 43
- Wins: 32
- By knockout: 7
- Losses: 10
- Draws: 1

Other information
- Boxing record from BoxRec

Daniel Ammann (born 15 December 1982) is a former Australian professional boxer.

In Ammann's career, he has fought opponents including Shane Cameron, Dominic Vea, Anthony McCracken, Mohamed Azzaoui, Lawrence Tauasa, Brad Pitt, David Aloua, Tony Conquest and Brian Minto. He has also fought future UFC Middleweight Champion Israel Adesanya during his early boxing stint.

During his career he has fought for Commonwealth (British Empire) cruiserweight title, WBC – OPBF cruiserweight title and has won the Australian Cruiserweight title twice and New South Wales State Cruiserweight title once.

== Professional titles ==
- Australian New South Wales State
  - NSW State cruiserweight title (188½ Ibs)
- Australian National Boxing Federation
  - Australian National cruiserweight title (187¼ Ibs)
  - Australian National cruiserweight title (199½ Ibs)

== Professional boxing record ==
43 fights	32 wins	10 losses
By knockout	7	3
By decision	24	7
By disqualification	1	0
Draws	1	
