= Nikodem Jeżewski =

Polish boxer (born 1991)

Personal information
- Born: 29 May 1991 (age 35) Kościerzyna, Poland
- Height: 6 ft 3 in (191 cm)
- Weight: Cruiserweight; Bridgerweight

Boxing career
- Reach: 75 in (191 cm)
- Stance: Orthodox

Boxing record
- Total fights: 31
- Wins: 26
- Win by KO: 12
- Losses: 3
- Draws: 1
- No contests: 1

Nikodem Piotr Jeżewski (born 29 May 1991) is a Polish professional boxer.

== Professional career ==
Jeżewski made his professional debut on 18 May 2013, against Bartosz Szwarczynski. Jeżewski won the fight via a second-round corner retirement.

His first title fight came on 10 December 2016, against Michał Cieślak for the IBF Baltic and Republic of Poland cruiserweight titles. Jeżewski went into the bout with an undefeated 12–0–1. The original result was a third-round TKO victory for Cieślak. On 9 January 2017, it was revealed both fighters failed drug tests, and both were subsequently suspended for one year, and the bout was overturned to a no contest (NC).

His return fight came on 16 February 2018, against Taras Oleksiyenko. Jeżewski won the fight via a seventh-round knockout.

After two more wins, he faced Lance Bryant on 9 November 2018. Jeżewski won the fight via a Unanimous Decision.

After another two wins, he faced Marek Procházka on 2 October 2020, for the vacant Republic of Poland International cruiserweight title. Jeżewski won the fight via unanimous decision, winning his first career championship in the process.

For his next fight, it was announced on 7 December 2020, that he will be facing Lawrence Okolie on 12 December 2020, replacing compatriot Krzysztof Głowacki who contracted COVID-19, stepping in on five days notice. The bout was for the vacant WBO International cruiserweight title, and took place on the undercard of Anthony Joshua vs Kubrat Pulev. Jeżewski lost the fight via a second-round TKO, suffering his first career loss.

After a win over Vladimír Řezníček, he faced Artur Mann on 19 February 2022, for the vacant IBO Inter-Continental cruiserweight title. Jeżewski lost the fight via unanimous decision. This bout went viral after the first stanza of the German national anthem, which is not part of the official anthem and is usually avoided due to its associations with the Nazi era, was played before the fight.

After going on a six-fight win streak, he faced Marko Čalić on 15 December 2025, for the vacant WBC International bridgerweight title. Jeżewski lost the fight via unanimous decision.

== Professional boxing record ==
31 fights	26 wins	3 losses
By knockout	12	1
By decision	14	2
Draws	1	
No contests	1	

No.	Result	Record	Opponent	Type	Round, time	Date	Location	Notes
31	Loss	26–3–1 (1)	Marko Čalić	UD	10	15 Dec 2025	Hala Stulecia, Sopot, Poland	For vacant WBC International bridgerweight title
30	Win	26–2–1 (1)	Rosmen Brito	KO	4 (8), 1:58	20 Sep 2025	Hala Sportowa, Żukowo, Poland	
29	Win	25–2–1 (1)	Vaclav Pejsar	UD	8	12 Apr 2025	Hala Stulecia, Sopot, Poland	
28	Win	24–2–1 (1)	Adam Kolařík	KO	6 (8), 2:11	2 Mar 2024	Hala Widowiskowo-Sportowa, Koszalin, Poland	
27	Win	23–2–1 (1)	Jakub Sosinski	UD	8	2 Dec 2023	Hala Sokolnia, Kościerzyna, Poland	
26	Win	22–2–1 (1)	Serge Michel	RTD	6 (10), 3:00	2 Sep 2022	Hala Polonia, Częstochowa, Poland	
25	Win	21–2–1 (1)	Arturs Gorlovs	UD	10	27 May 2022	Hala Globus, Lublin, Poland	
24	Loss	20–2–1 (1)	Artur Mann	UD	10	19 Feb 2022	Hala Orbita, Wrocław, Poland	For IBO Inter-Continental cruiserweight title
23	Win	20–1–1 (1)	Vladimír Řezníček	UD	8	14 May 2021	Studio Transcolor, Szeligi, Poland	
22	Loss	19–1–1 (1)	Lawrence Okolie	TKO	2 (12), 1:45	12 Dec 2020	The SSE Arena, Wembley, England	For vacant WBO International cruiserweight title
21	Win	19–0–1 (1)	Marek Procházka	UD	10	2 Oct 2020	Hala Sportowo-Widowiskowa, Wielki Klincz, Poland	Won vacant Republic of Poland International cruiserweight title
20	Win	18–0–1 (1)	Tamas Lodi	UD	8	14 Dec 2019	Hala Sokolnia, Kościerzyna, Poland	
19	Win	17–0–1 (1)	Shawndell Winters	MD	8	6 Apr 2019	Spodek, Katowice, Poland	
18	Win	16–0–1 (1)	Lance Bryant	UD	8	9 Nov 2018	Hala Widowiskowo-Sportowa MOSiR, Konin, Poland	
17	Win	15–0–1 (1)	Petar Mrvalj	KO	3 (8), 1:37	31 Aug 2018	Zalew Karczunek, Kałuszyn, Poland	
16	Win	14–0–1 (1)	Demetrius Banks	UD	8	4 May 2018	Hala Sokolnia, Kościerzyna, Poland	
15	Win	13–0–1 (1)	Taras Oleksiyenko	KO	7 (8), 2:09	16 Feb 2018	Hala MOSiR, Wyszków, Poland	
14	NC	12–0–1 (1)	Michał Cieślak	NC	3 (10), 2:02	10 Dec 2016	Hala Orbita, Wrocław, Poland	IBF Baltic, and Republic of Poland cruiserweight titles at stake; Originally TKO win for Cieślak, changed to NC after both fighters failed drug tests
13	Win	12–0–1	Wladimir Letr	TKO	1 (8), 1:20	19 Dec 2015	Hala ICDS, Łomianki, Poland	
12	Win	11–0–1	Attila Palko	KO	2 (6), 2:50	23 Oct 2015	Hala Szkoly Podstawowej nr 50, Białystok, Poland	
11	Win	10–0–1	Tomislav Rudan	UD	6	16 May 2015	Hala Sportowa, Inowrocław, Poland	
10	Win	9–0–1	Łukasz Zygmunt	UD	6	12 Dec 2014	Hala MOSiR, Radom, Poland	
9	Win	8–0–1	Toni Visic	UD	6	17 Oct 2014	Hala Sportowa, Dzierżoniów, Poland	
8	Win	7–0–1	Marko Martinjak	KO	4 (6), 2:37	16 May 2014	Hala Sportowa, Ślesin, Poland	
7	Win	6–0–1	Artsiom Charniakevich	UD	6	26 Apr 2014	Galeria Korona, Kielce, Poland	
6	Draw	5–0–1	Andrzej Witkowski	MD	6	8 Feb 2014	Hala Sportowa, ul. Sosnowa 3, Pionki, Poland	
5	Win	5–0	Viktor Szalai	TKO	2 (4), 2:10	22 Dec 2013	Hala MOSiR, Radom, Poland	
4	Win	4–0	Artsiom Hurbo	TKO	3 (4), 1:40	5 Oct 2013	Hala Sportowa, Malbork, Poland	
3	Win	3–0	Michał Szebestik	PTS	4	31 Aug 2013	Sportgym Radom, Radom, Poland	
2	Win	2–0	Krzysztof Chochel	TKO	1 (4)	25 May 2013	IFCO Arena, Köpenick, Germany	
1	Win	1–0	Bartosz Szwarczynski	RTD	2 (4), 2:35	18 May 2013	IFCO Arena, Köpenick, Germany	
