= Vaitele Soi =

Samoan boxer

- Born: Satiamaalii Vaitele Soi; 5 August 1987 (age 39); Samoa
- Nationality: Samoan
- Height: 180 cm (5 ft 11 in)
- Weight: 89.7 kg (198 lb; 14 st 2 lb)
- Division: Cruiserweight
- Style: Boxing
- Stance: Orthodox
- Trainer: Lolo Heimuli
- Years active: 2008–2015

Professional boxing record
- Total: 27
- Wins: 25
- By knockout: 16
- Losses: 2
- By knockout: 0
- Draws: 0

Other information
- Boxing record from BoxRec
- Last updated on: 28 January 2017

Vaitele Soi (born 5 August 1987, Samoa) is a retired Samoan professional boxer.

Soi has fought a few notable boxers in his career including Mohamed Azzaoui, Shane Chapman, Brad Pitt and Anthony McCracken.

The biggest fight in Soi's career was against Anthony McCracken for the WBA Pan African, WBO Asia Pacific and WBC – OPBF Cruiserweight title. Despite losing the fight by unanimous decision, Soi received a WBO Asia Pacific ranking peaking at 5th.

== Professional boxing titles ==
- World Boxing Foundation
  - WBF Asia Pacific cruiserweight title (186¾ Ibs)
- Samoa
  - Samoa National cruiserweight title (194 Ibs)
- Tournament
  - 2011 New Zealand cruiserweight Tournament winner (196¾ Ibs)
  - Super 8 II runner up (196¾ Ibs)

== Professional boxing record ==
27 fights	25 wins	2 losses
By knockout	16	0
By decision	9	2
Draws	0	

No.	Result	Record	Opponent	Type	Round, time	Date	Location	Notes
27	Win	25–2	(United States) Clarence Tillman	UD	4	7 July 2015	Apia, Samoa	
26	Lose	24–2	(Australia) Anthony McCracken	UD	10	28 March 2015	Horncastle Arena, Christchurch, New Zealand	WBA Pan African & WBC – OPBF & WBO Asia Pacific cruiserweight titles
25	Lose	24–1	(Australia) Brad Pitt	MD	3	22 November 2014	North Shore Events Centre, North Shore, New Zealand	Super 8 II – Finals
24	Win	24–0	(Samoa) Monty Filimaea	UD	3	22 November 2014	North Shore Events Centre, North Shore, New Zealand	Super 8 II – Semi Finals
23	Win	23–0	(New Zealand) Lance Bryant	SD	3	22 November 2014	North Shore Events Centre, North Shore, New Zealand	Super 8 II – Quarter Finals
22	Win	22–0	(American Samoa) Henry Wells	TKO	3 (6)	19 December 2013	Faleata Sports Complex Gym 1, Apia, Samoa	
21	Win	21–0	(Fiji) Iobe Ledua	TKO	(6)	30 May 2013	Faleata Sports Complex Gym 1, Apia, Samoa	
20	Win	20–0	(New Zealand) Junior Maletino Iakopo	MD	6	23 March 2012	ABA Stadium, Auckland, New Zealand	
19	Win	19–0	(New Zealand) Filipo Fonoti Masoe	TKO	1 (6) 0:54	18 November 2011	ABA Stadium, Auckland, New Zealand	
18	Win	18–0	(New Zealand) Joe Betham	KO	1 (4) 0:54	14 October 2011	Manurewa Netball Centre, Manurewa, New Zealand	
17	Win	17–0	(New Zealand) Shane Chapman	TKO	3 (3) 0:47	7 May 2011	ASB Stadium, Kohimarama, New Zealand	Cruiserweight tournament – Final
16	Win	16–0	(Algeria) Mohamed Azzaoui	MD	3	7 May 2011	ASB Stadium, Kohimarama, New Zealand	Cruiserweight tournament – Semi Final
15	Win	15–0	(Samoa) Francis Pratsch	TKO	3 (3) 1:43	7 May 2011	ASB Stadium, Kohimarama, New Zealand	Cruiserweight tournament – Quarter Final
14	Win	14–0	(New Zealand) Oscar Siale	SD	6	19 March 2011	Vodafone Events Centre, Manukau City, New Zealand	
13	Win	13–0	(New Zealand) Winston Helu	TKO	4 (6)	5 June 2010	Kelston Boys High School Gym, Kelston, New Zealand	
12	Win	12–0	(New Zealand) Faitua Shine Kalolo	TKO	1 (4) 2:40	22 May 2010	Queen Elizabeth Youth Centre, Tauranga, New Zealand	
11	Win	11–0	(Fiji) Ben Naqasima	TKO	1 (6) 2:10	13 April 2010	Leisure Centre, Otara, New Zealand	
10	Win	10–0	(New Zealand) Oscar Siale	MD	6	21 January 2010	(Samoa) ABA Stadium, Auckland, New Zealand	
9	Win	9–o	(Samoa) Iosia Nanai	TKO	6 (10) 1:42	1 December 2009	Faleata Sports Complex Gym 1, Apia, Samoa	Samoa National cruiserweight title
8	Win	8–0	(New Zealand) Wayne Orbell	UD	1 (6) 1:17	6 October 2009	Leisure Centre, Otara, New Zealand	
7	Win	7–0	(Fiji) Oscar Talemaira	UD	6	8 September 2007	Faleata Sports Complex Gym 1, Apia, Samoa	
6	Win	6–0	(Samoa) Sefanaia Kau	KO	1 (6) 0:40	3 July 2009	Faleata Sports Complex Gym 1, Apia, Samoa	
5	Win	5–0	(Samoa) Martin Opetaia	UD	6	2 June 2009	Faleata Sports Complex Gym 1, Apia, Samoa	
4	Win	4–0	(Samoa) Samuelu Togafiti	TKO	1 (8) 1:58	30 April 2009	Faleata Sports Complex Gym 1, Apia, Samoa	
3	Win	3–0	(Australia) Danny Price	TKO	1 (10) 1:43	19 December 2008	Croatian Club, Punchbowl, New South Wales, Australia	vacant World Boxing Foundation Asia Pacific cruiserweight title
2	Win	2–0	(New Zealand) Jeff Stutt	TKO	4 (4)	16 September 2008	Leisure Centre, Otara, New Zealand	
1	Win	1–0	(Tonga) Teka Valu	TKO	2 (6)	30 July 2008	Atele Stadium, Nukualofa, Tonga	Professional debut
