= Michał Cieślak (boxer) =

Polish boxer

Personal information
- Born: 19 April 1989 (age 37) Kozienice, Poland
- Height: 6 ft 3 in (191 cm)
- Weight: Cruiserweight

Boxing career
- Reach: 79 in (201 cm)
- Stance: Orthodox

Boxing record
- Total fights: 31
- Wins: 28
- Win by KO: 22
- Losses: 2
- No contests: 1

Michał Cieślak is a Polish professional boxer. He has held the World Boxing Council (WBC) cruiserweight title since September 2026.

== Professional career ==
Cieślak made his professional debut on 29 June 2013, scoring a four-round unanimous decision (UD) victory over Lukasz Zygmunt at the Amfiteatr in Ostróda, Poland. All three judges scored the bout 39–36.

After compiling a record of 8–0 (4 KOs) he defeated Jarno Rosberg on 22 August 2015 at the Amfiteatr in Międzyzdroje, Poland, capturing the vacant Republic of Poland Youth International cruiserweight title via first-round knockout (KO).

Cieślak was booked to face Shawn Cox on 26 September 2015, on the undercard of a Polsat Sport pay per view broadcast card. He won the fight by a first-round knockout, stopping Cox before the midway point of the opening round. Cieślak face another journeyman, Hamza Wandera, on 27 November 2015. He made quick work of his opponent, as he won the fight by a second-round technical knockout.

Cieślak faced the one-time WBC cruiserweight title challenger Francisco Palacios on 2 April 2016. He won the fight by a fourth-round technical knockout. A month later, on 28 May 2016, Cieślak faced Alexander Kubich. He won the fight by a ninth-round technical knockout. Cieślak faced Iluian Ilie on 17 September 2016, and won the fight by a second-round technical knockout.

Cieślak faced Nikodem Jeżewski for the vacant IBF Baltic, and Republic of Poland cruiserweight titles on 10 December 2016 at the Hala Orbita in Wrocław, Poland. Cieślak defeated Jezewski via third-round technical knockout (TKO). On 9 January it was revealed both fighters had failed their respective drug tests. They were both subsequently suspended for one year with Cieślak's win being overturned and ruled a no contest (NC).

He returned to action in October 2017, scoring a UD victory against Ivica Bacurin. Cieślak secured another three wins, two by stoppage, before facing Ilunga Makabu for the vacant WBC cruiserweight title on 31 January 2020 at the Temporary Arena in Kinshasa, Democratic Republic of The Congo. Cieślak suffered the first defeat of his career, losing by UD, with the scorecards reading 116–111, 115–111 and 114–112.

Following his failed title bid, Cieślak was booked to face Taylor Mabika. The fight was scheduled as the main event of a Polsat Sport broadcast card on 5 December 2020. He successfully bounced back from his first professional loss with a sixth-round technical knockout of Mabika. Cieślak was next scheduled to face Yury Kashinsky on 15 May 2021. He won the fight by a first-round technical knockout.

Cieślak is scheduled to challenge the reigning WBO cruiserweight champion Lawrence Okolie in the main event of a DAZN broadcast card on 27 February 2022.

== Professional boxing record ==
31 fights	28 wins	2 losses
By knockout	22	0
By decision	6	2
No contests	1	

No.	Result	Record	Opponent	Type	Round, time	Date	Location	Notes
31	Win	28–2 (1)	Jean Pascal	TKO	4 (12) 1:10	28 Jun 2025	Place Bell, Laval, Canada	Won vacant WBC interim cruiserweight title
30	Win	27–2 (1)	Felix Valera	TKO	3 (10) 0:04	26 Oct 2024	Nosalowy Dwór, Zakopane, Poland	
29	Win	26–2 (1)	Juan Diaz	TKO	4 (8) 0:01	20 Apr 2024	KGHM Arena Ślęza Wrocław, Wrocław, Poland	
28	Win	25–2 (1)	Tommy McCarthy	TKO	7 (12) 1:05	4 Nov 2023	Nosalowy Dwór, Zakopane, Poland	Retained EBU cruiserweight title
27	Win	24–2 (1)	Dylan Bregeon	KO	4 (12) 2:59	22 Apr 2023	G2A Arena, Jasionka 953, Rzeszów, Poland	Won vacant EBU cruiserweight title
26	Win	23–2 (1)	Krzysztof Twardowski	TKO	5 (10), 2:01	1 Oct 2022	MOSiR Hall, Al. Zygmuntowskie 4, Lublin, Poland	For vacant Republic of Poland cruiserweight title
25	Win	22–2 (1)	Enrico Koelling	TKO	1 (10), 2:00	24 Jun 2022	Hala Legionów, Kielce, Poland	
24	Loss	21–2 (1)	Lawrence Okolie	UD	12	27 Feb 2022	The O2 Arena, London, England	For WBO cruiserweight title
23	Win	21–1 (1)	Yury Kashinsky	TKO	1 (12), 1:53	14 May 2021	Transcolor, Szeligi, Poland	
22	Win	20–1 (1)	Taylor Mabika	TKO	6 (10), 0:45	5 Dec 2020	DoubleTree by Hilton Hotel Conference Centre, Warsaw, Poland	
21	Loss	19–1 (1)	Ilunga Makabu	UD	12	31 Jan 2020	Temporary Arena, Kinshasa, Democratic Republic of The Congo	For vacant WBC cruiserweight title
20	Win	19–0 (1)	Olanrewaju Durodola	TKO	2 (10), 1:56	31 May 2019	MZOS Pruszków, ul. Bohaterów Warszawy 4, Pruszków, Poland	Won vacant Republic of Poland International cruiserweight title
19	Win	18–0 (1)	Youri Kalenga	RTD	7 (8), 3:00	1 Mar 2019	Legionowo Arena, Legionowo, Poland	
18	Win	17–0 (1)	Dusan Krstin	RTD	5 (8), 3:00	16 Jun 2018	Torwar Sport Hall, Warsaw, Poland	
17	Win	16–0 (1)	Serhiy Radchenko	UD	8	2 Jun 2018	Legionowo Arena, Legionowo, Poland	
16	Win	15–0 (1)	Ivica Bacurin	UD	8	21 Oct 2017	Kopalnia Soli, Wielczka, Poland	
15	NC	14–0 (1)	Nikodem Jeżewski	NC	3 (10), 2:02	10 Dec 2016	Hala Orbita, Wrocław, Poland	IBF Baltic, and Republic of Poland cruiserweight titles at stake; Originally TKO win for Cieślak, changed to NC after both fighters failed drug tests
14	Win	14–0	Iluian Ilie	TKO	2 (8), 2:45	17 Sep 2016	Ergo Arena, Gdańsk, Poland	
13	Win	13–0	Alexander Kubich	TKO	9 (10), 0:49	28 May 2016	Szczecin, Poland	
12	Win	12–0	Francisco Palacios	TKO	4 (10), 1:56	2 Apr 2016	Tauron Arena, Kraków, Poland	
11	Win	11–0	Hamza Wandera	TKO	2 (8), 2:59	27 Nov 2015	Hala na Podpromiu, Rzeszów, Poland	
10	Win	10–0	Shawn Cox	KO	1 (8), 1:24	26 Sep 2015	Atlas Arena, Łódź, Poland	
9	Win	9–0	Jarno Rosberg	KO	1 (10), 1:46	22 Aug 2015	Amfiteatr, Międzyzdroje, Poland	Won vacant Republic of Poland Youth International cruiserweight title
8	Win	8–0	Antoine Boya	TKO	8 (8), 2:41	27 Jun 2015	Krynica-Zdrój, Poland	
7	Win	7–0	Ismail Abdoul	UD	6	19 Sep 2014	MOSiR Hall, Radom, Poland	
6	Win	6–0	Andrzej Witkowski	TKO	2 (6), 1:58	31 May 2014	Hala Globus, ul. Kazimierza Wielkiego 8, Lublin, Poland	
5	Win	5–0	Art Binkowski	TKO	2 (6), 1:27	26 Apr 2014	Legionowo Arena, Legionowo, Poland	
4	Win	4–0	Ferenc Zsalek	TKO	2 (6), 2:50	22 Dec 2013	MOSiR Hall, Radom, Poland	
3	Win	3–0	Mathieu Monnier	UD	4	9 Nov 2013	Ełk, Poland	
2	Win	2–0	Lukasz Rusiewicz	UD	4	19 Oct 2013	Kopalnia Soli, Wieliczka, Poland	
1	Win	1–0	Lukasz Zygmunt	UD	4	29 Jun 2013	Amfiteatr, Ostróda, Poland	

== See also ==
- List of male boxers
- List of world cruiserweight boxing champions
- List of doping cases in sport

Sporting positions
Regional boxing titles
New title	Polish Youth International cruiserweight champion August 22, 2015 – 2016; Vacated	Vacant
Vacant Title last held by Adam Balski	Polish International cruiserweight champion May 31, 2019 – 2020; Vacated	Vacant Title next held by Nikodem Jezewski
New title	Polish cruiserweight champion October 1, 2022 – 2022; Vacated	Vacant
Vacant Title last held by Chris Billam-Smith	European cruiserweight champion April 22, 2023 – 2024; Vacated	Vacant Title next held by Jack Massey
World boxing titles
Vacant Title last held by Marcelo Domínguez	WBC cruiserweight champion Interim title June 28, 2025 – September 14, 2026; Promoted	Vacant
Preceded by Noel Mikaelian; Stripped	WBC cruiserweight champion September 14, 2026 – present	Incumbent
