= Floyd Masson =

Australian boxer

Personal information
- Nationality: New Zealand; Australian
- Born: 1 December 1991 (age 34) Te Awamutu, New Zealand
- Height: 184 cm (6 ft 0 in)
- Weight: Cruiserweight

Boxing career
- Stance: Southpaw

Boxing record
- Total fights: 20
- Wins: 17
- Win by KO: 9
- Losses: 3

Floyd Masson (born 1 December 1991) is a New Zealand-Australian professional boxer.

Masson is a former IBO World Crusierweight champion after his win over Italian boxer Fabio Turchi in April 2023. He has also held the IBF Pan Pacific Crusierweight title.

== Amateur boxing ==
Masson fought in 45 amateur boxing fights in his career. Although unable to pick up a New Zealand national title, after moving to Australia and joining a new gym he managed to win Australian Golden Gloves. During his amateur career, Masson moved to Perth, Western Australian and was coached under Australian coach Sean Nash.

== Professional career ==
Masson made his professional boxing debut in 2018 against New Zealander Jordan Mororoa. Masson won the fight with his opponent retiring in the corner. This began the winning streak for Masson. After a win over Abdullad Saad Alghmadi in October 2018, Masson fought in New Zealand in November 2018 for the first time since fighting as an amateur boxer. Before the fight, Masson stated his ambitions to win the Australian title before aiming for a boxing world title. Masson took on Tuvalu born New Zealand boxer Navosa Loata on the Lucas Browne vs Junior Pati undercard. Masson won the fight by unanimous decision, however he sustained cracked ribs during the fight.

After a win over New Zealander Waikato Falefehi, Masson fought journeyman Roger Izonritei. Despite the fight being scheduled for eight rounds, Masson won the fight in the first round by knockout. In June 2019, Masson signed a co-managerial deal with MJA Platinum. In the sixth fight of his career, Masson took on Christian Ndzie Tsoye in one of the toughest fights of his career. The fight was for the promoters version of the Western Australia State cruiserweight title. Masson took Tsoye the full 8 rounds to win his first boxing title by unanimous decision. Masson finished his 2019 boxing year in October with a unanimous decision win over Indian boxer Kuldeep Singh.

=== Contender to National Champion 2020 - 2021 ===
Masson had his first and only fight of 2020 in March against New Zealander and IBO Asia Pacific champion Lance Bryant. Masson won against Bryant with ease with a TKO win in the first round. Lance Bryant retired shortly after the fight. Due to the worldwide COVID-19 pandemic, Floyd Masson was not able to secure any more fights in 2020.

In February 2021, Masson announced that he would move to Brisbane, Queensland, Australia to focus on his boxing career. He started the year moving to Eastside Boxing Gym and with new promoter Angelo Di Carlo under Ace Boxing Group. For the first fight for the year and under the new promoter, Masson took on New Zealander Waikato Falefehi in a rematch in March 2021. Masson won the fight by third round stoppage. In July 2021, Masson took on Joseph Liga to fight for the first major title of his career, the vacant ANBF Australasian cruiserweight title. Masson won the fight in the 4th round by stoppage. To finish his 2021, Masson took on the biggest fight of his career, Australian Mark Flanagan in December 2021. Flanagan has fought multiple New Zealanders in the past and has fought for the world title on two separate occasions. Masson won the fight by majority decision winning the Australian national title and successfully defending his Australasian title. The fight was a close fight and has since been described as one of the best national title fights that has ever been seen. After the fight, Masson won multiple awards for the fight including International Fight of the year and Champion Of The Year under the New Zealand Boxing Awards. On 31 January 2022, it was announced that Masson won Australia's version of the boxing awards, the 2022 Everlast Aus-Boxing Awards for round of the year. The round he won the award for was against Mark Flanagan again in the 10th round.

=== World Rankings, IBO World title fight 2022 - 2023 ===
Masson began his 2022 boxing year where he took on Indian boxer Vikas Singh. The fight went the distance with Masson doing well, which showed when Masson knocked down his opponent in the eighth and final round. Masson won the fight by Unanimous Decision, winning all the round on all of the judges scorecards. In April 2022, Masson started getting ranked in the WBC, receiving the ranking of 39th in the cruiserweight division. In December 2022, Masson debut on the IBF cruiserweight rankings, reaching 12th. In January 2023, it was announced that Masson would take on Italian boxer Fabio Turchi on April 1 for the vacant IBO World Cruiserweight title. Masson won the fight by unanimous decision, winning his first World title. After the fight both Masson and Turchi went to hospital in separate ambulances. Masson would go on to defend his world title against Belgium boxer Yves Ngabu. Unfortunately, Masson lost the fight by sixth round stoppage.

=== Road to the world title 2024 - 2025 ===
Masson took 11 months off due to injury that was surgically repaired in his arm. He would make his return in August 2024 where he took on New Zealander Joshua Francis. Masson would win the fight by fourth round stoppage. Masson would finish his 2024 year when he went to Poland to take on world title contender Mateusz Masternak in November 2024. Masson would loss the fight by Unanimous Decision, which was considered controversial as some believed Masson won the fight. Masson would walk away from the fight with a significant swollen ear injury. Masson made his No Limit Boxing debut, a major Australian Boxing promoter when he took on Austine Nnamdi in March 2025. Masson won the fight by unanimous decision. In July 2025, Masson took on Joseph Parkers litter brother John Parker for the IBF Pan Pacific Crusierweight title. Masson stated he wanted David Nyika next if he defeated John Parker. Masson won the fight by seventh round stoppage, picking up his first regional title from either IBF, WBC, WBO or WBA when he won the IBF Pan Pacific title. In September 2025, it was announced that Masson would take on Indian fighter Dharmender Grewal on his second No Limit Boxing card. Unfortunately Grewal did not end up fighting and was replaced with Johan Linde on two days notice. Masson won the fight against Linde by unanimous decision.

== Personal life ==
Masson started boxing around the age of 15. Around that time, a person who helped out with training gave Masson guidance about not drinking while boxing, which was a strong influence and lead Masson to not drink alcohol. Outside of boxing, Masson is a keen surfer, and is passionate about food.

== Boxing titles ==
=== Amateur Boxing ===
- Boxing Australia
  - Australian Golden Gloves

=== Promotion titles ===
- Dragon Fire Boxing
  - Western Australia state Cruiserweight title

=== State and National titles ===
- Australian National Boxing Federation
  - Australasian Cruiserweight title
  - Australian National Cruiserweight title

=== Regional titles ===
- International Boxing Federation
  - Pan Pacific Cruiserweight title

=== World titles ===
- International Boxing Organization
  - World Cruiserweight title

== Professional boxing record ==
20 fights	17 wins	3 losses
By knockout	9	1
By decision	8	2

No.	Result	Record	Opponent	Type	Round, time	Date	Location	Notes
20	Loss	17–3	David Nyika	UD	12	8 Aug 2026	Eventfinda Stadium, North Shore, New Zealand	IBF World title eliminator
19	Win	17–2	Johan Linde	UD	6	18 Sep 2025	Queensland Tennis Centre, Tennyson, Australia	
18	Win	16–2	John Parker	TKO	7 (10)	30 Jul 2025	Brisbane Powerhouse, New Farm, Australia	Won vacant IBF Pan Pacific Cruiserweight title
17	Win	15–2	Austine Nnamdi	UD	8	1 Mar 2025	South Bank Piazza, South Brisbane, Australia	
16	Loss	14–2	Mateusz Masternak	UD	10	16 Nov 2024	KGHM Sleza Arena, Wrocław, Poland	For vacant Republic of Poland International Cruiserweight title
15	Win	14–1	Joshua Francis	TKO	4 (8)	17 Aug 2024	Mansfield Tavern, Queensland, Australia	
14	Loss	13–1	Yves Ngabu	TKO	6 (12), 2:32	9 Sep 2023	Eatons Hill Hotel, Brisbane, Australia	Lost IBO World Cruiserweight title
13	Win	13–0	Fabio Turchi	UD	12	1 Apr 2023	Eatons Hill Hotel, Brisbane, Australia	Won vacant IBO World Cruiserweight title
12	Win	12–0	Vikas Singh	UD	8	4 Mar 2022	Eatons Hill Hotel, Brisbane, Australia	
11	Win	11–0	Mark Flanagan	MD	10	4 Dec 2021	Eatons Hill Hotel, Brisbane, Australia	Won Australian cruiserweight title Retained ANBF Australasian cruiserweight title
10	Win	10–0	Joseph Liga	TKO	4 (10), 2:58	24 Jul 2021	Eatons Hill Hotel, Brisbane, Australia	Won vacant ANBF Australasian cruiserweight title
9	Win	9–0	Waikato Falefehi	TKO	3 (6), 1:54	27 Mar 2021	Eatons Hill Hotel, Brisbane, Australia	
8	Win	8–0	Lance Bryant	TKO	1 (6), 2:45	6 Mar 2020	Metro City, Perth, Australia	
7	Win	7–0	Kuldeep Singh	UD	4	4 Oct 2019	Metro City, Perth, Australia	
6	Win	6–0	Christian Ndzie Tsoye	UD	8	26 Jul 2019	Metro City, Perth, Australia	Won vacant Dragon Fire Boxing Western Australia state cruiserweight title
5	Win	5–0	Roger Izonritei	KO	1 (8), 0:08	3 May 2019	WA Italian Club, Perth, Australia	
4	Win	4–0	Waikato Falefehi	TKO	2 (4), 2:21	8 Mar 2019	Metro City, Perth, Australia	
3	Win	3–0	Navosa Ioata	UD	4	24 Nov 2018	AMI Netball Centre, Auckland, New Zealand	
2	Win	2–0	Abdullad Saad Alghmadi	UD	4	5 Oct 2018	Metro City, Perth, Australia	
1	Win	1–0	Jordan Mororoa	RTD	3 (4), 3:00	28 Apr 2018	Arena Joondalup, Perth, Australia	

== Awards ==
- 2021 New Zealand Boxing Awards International Fight of the year (Won)
- 2021 New Zealand Boxing Awards Champion of the year (Won)
- 2021 Everlast Aus-Boxing Awards Round of the year (Won)
