= Dominic Vea =

Australian boxer

Personal information
- Nickname: The Dominator
- Nationality: Australian
- Born: 2 April 1981 (age 45) Blacktown
- Height: 6 ft 1 in (185 cm)
- Weight: cruiser/heavyweight

Boxing career
- Reach: 74 in (188 cm)
- Stance: Orthodox

Boxing record
- Total fights: 16
- Wins: 13 (KO 10)
- Losses: 3 (KO 1)

Dominic "The Dominator" Vea (born 2 April 1981 in Blacktown) is an Australian professional cruiser/heavyweight boxer of the 2000s and 2010s who won the Oriental and Pacific Boxing Federation (OPBF) cruiserweight title, World Boxing Organization (WBO) Oriental cruiserweight title, and Commonwealth cruiserweight title, and was a challenger for the Australian cruiserweight title against Daniel Ammann, his professional fighting weight varied from 188 1/2 lb (85.5 kg; 13 st 6.5 lb), i.e. cruiserweight to 220 3/4 lb (100.1 kg; 15 st 10.8 lb), i.e. heavyweight.
