= David Aloua =

New Zealand boxer (born 1987)

- Born: David Aloua-Rogers; 10 April 1987 (age 39); Auckland, New Zealand
- Height: 1.84 m (6 ft 0 in)
- Weight: 88.8 kg (196 lb; 14 st 0 lb)
- Division: Cruiserweight
- Stance: Orthodox
- Trainer: Lolo Heimuli
- Years active: 2011–present

Professional boxing record
- Total: 14
- Wins: 11
- By knockout: 8
- Losses: 3
- By knockout: 1
- Draws: 0

Amateur record
- Total: 41
- Wins: 30
- By knockout: 21
- Losses: 11

Other information
- Occupation: Professional boxer
- Boxing record from BoxRec
- Last updated on: 28 January 2017

David Aloua (born 24 April 1987) is a New Zealand professional boxer. As an amateur, he competed at the 2010 Commonwealth Games.

Aloua has peaked in the top 15 in the WBO, WBA, IBO, and Boxrec; and in the top 40 of the WBC.

== Amateur career ==
=== Amateur boxing titles ===
- 2009 New Zealand Boxing Amateur Championship 91 kg
- 2010 New Zealand Boxing Amateur Championship 91 kg
- Bronze Medal Commonwealth Amateur Boxing Championship 91 kg

== Professional career ==
Aloua got the biggest win in his career when he fought Brad Pitt for the WBA Pan African, WBO Asia Pacific and WBC OPBF cruiserweight titles. Aloua won the fight by knockout in the fourth round.

Aloua fought Anthony McCracken twice as a pro. The first time was in April 2012, for the vacant World Professional Boxing Federation Asia Pacific cruiserweight title. Aloua won the bout by split decision. The second time was in November 2014, for the WBO Asia Pacific, WBC OPBF and WBA Pan African cruiserweight title. McCracken won the bout by technical knockout in the seventh round. After the second bout, Aloua's team announced that there would eventually be a third bout, but nothing has come from it since then.

== Professional boxing record ==
15 fights	12 wins	3 losses
By knockout	8	1
By decision	4	2
Draws	0	

Res.	Record	Opponent	Type	Rd., time	Date	Location	Notes
Lose	12–3	(Australia) Kurtis Pegoraro	UD	4	2018-11-30	(Australia) Suncorp Stadium, Brisbane, Queensland	
Win	12–2	(New Zealand) Filipo Fonoti Masoe	UD	6	2017-02-03	Adelaide Oval, North Adelaide, South Australia	
Lose	11–2	(Australia) Anthony McCracken	TKO	7, (10) 2:45	2014-11-22	North Shore Events Centre, North Shore, Auckland, New Zealand	For WBO Asia Pacific, WBC – OPBF, WBA Pan African cruiserweight titles
Win	10–1	(Australia) Brad Pitt	KO	4, (12) 2:37	2014-04-09	Newcastle Entertainment Centre, New South Wales, Australia	Won vacant WBO Asia Pacific, WBC – OPBF, Vacant WBA Pan African cruiserweight titles
Win	9–1	(New Zealand) Junior Maletino Iakopo	TKO	3, (6) 2:37	2014-01-29	Brisbane Entertainment Centre, Boondall, Queensland, Australia	
Win	8–1	(Fiji) (Australia) Mosese Sorovi	TKO	3, (6) 2:37	2013-11-27	Allphones Arena, Olympic Park, Sydney, New South Wales, Australia	
Lose	7–1	(Australia) Daniel Ammann	UD	10	2013-01-30	Sydney Entertainment Centre, New South Wales, Australia	For Australian National cruiserweight title
Win	7–0	(Hungary) (Australia) Balazs Varga	UD	8	2012-11-30	Mansfield Tavern, Mansfield, Queensland, Australia	
Win	6–0	(Australia) Anthony McCracken	SD	10	2012-04-13	Tattersalls Club, Brisbane, Queensland, Australia	Won vacant WPBF Asia Pacific cruiserweight title
Win	5–0	(Samoa) (New Zealand) Monty Filimaea	KO	2, (6) 2:54	2012-02-08	Claudelands Arena, Hamilton, New Zealand	
Win	5–0	(Samoa) Faimasasa Tavu'i	TKO	9, (12) 2:38	2011-11-25	Salle Louis 'Babo' Aitamai de Fautaua, Papeete, French Polynesia	Won vacant UBO International cruiserweight title
Win	4–0	(Australia) Hunter Sam	UD	6	2011-10-19	Newcastle Entertainment Centre, Newcastle, New South Wales, Australia	
Win	3–0	(Tonga) (Australia) Walter Pupu'a	TKO	1, (8) 2:25	2011-08-26	Cronulla Sutherland Leagues Club, Cronulla, New South Wales, Australia	
Win	2–0	(New Zealand) Henry Taani	TKO	4,(6)	2011-06-05	The Trusts Arena, Auckland, New Zealand	
Win	1–0	(New Zealand) Jae Bryce	KO	3, (4) 2:09	2011-01-29	Gold Coast Convention Centre, Broadbeach, Queensland, Australia	

Vacant Title last held by Mohamed Dridi; Vacated	UBO International Cruiserweight; Title; 25 November 2011 – 23 March 2013	Vacant Stripped
Vacant	WPBF Asia Pacific Cruiserweight; Title; 13 April 2012 – present	Incumbent
Vacant Title last held by Alexander Alekseev; Stripped	WBO Asia Pacific Cruiserweight; Title; 9 April 2014 – 22 November 2014	Succeeded by Anthony McCracken
Preceded by Brad Pitt	OPBF Cruiserweight; Title; 9 April 2014 – 22 November 2014	Succeeded by Anthony McCracken
Vacant Title last held by Daniel Baff; Stripped	WBA Pan African Cruiserweight; Title; 9 April 2014 – 22 November 2014	Succeeded by Anthony McCracken
