= Anthony McCracken =

Australian boxer

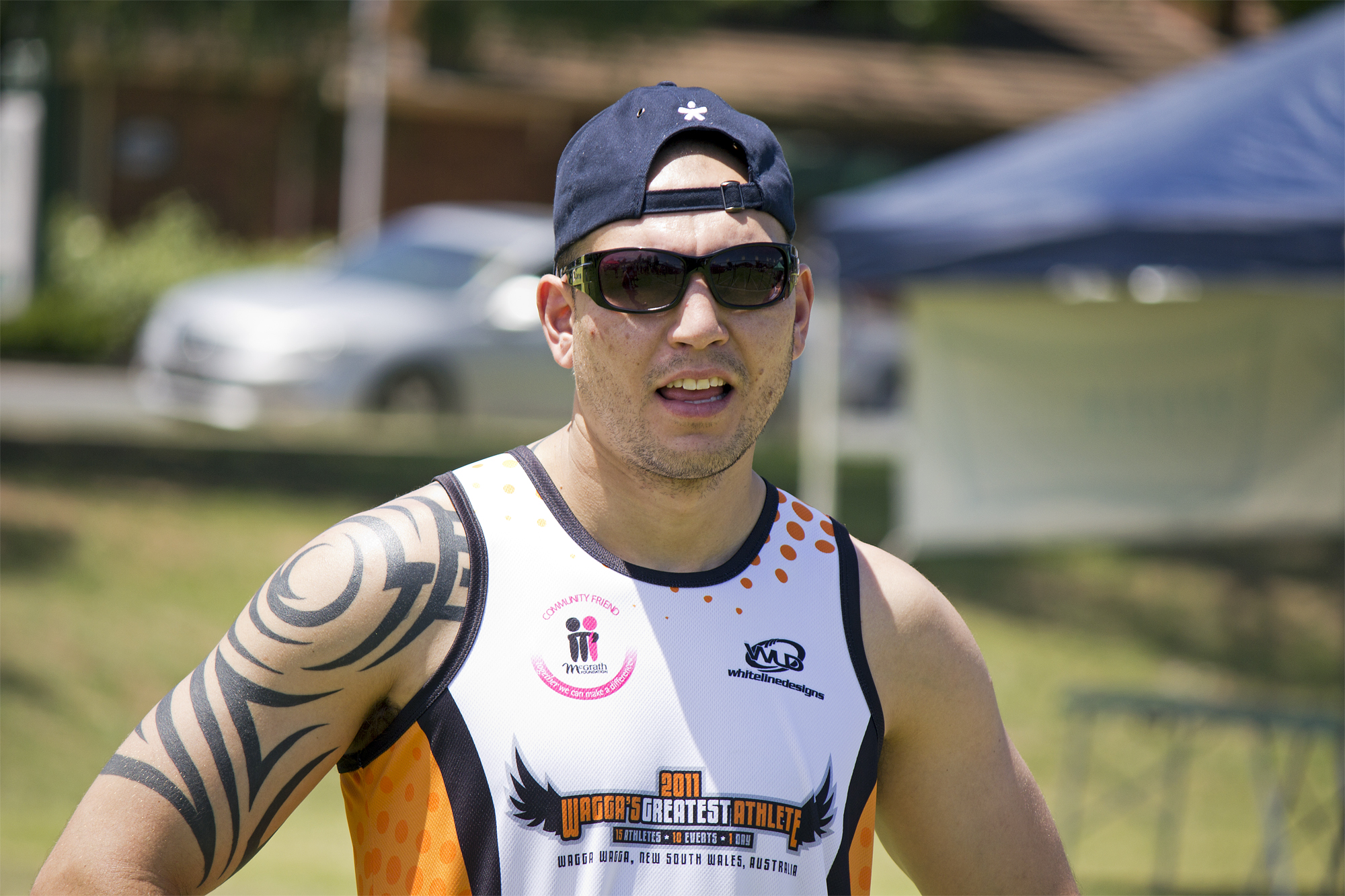
- Anthony McCracken
- Born: Anthony McCracken; 11 May 1983 (age 43); Sydney, New South Wales, Australia
- Nationality: Australian
- Height: 189 cm (6 ft 2 in)
- Weight: 90.5 kg (200 lb; 14 st 4 lb)
- Division: Cruiserweight
- Style: Boxing
- Stance: Orthodox

Professional boxing record
- Total: 26
- Wins: 18
- By knockout: 8
- Losses: 7
- By knockout: 1
- Draws: 1

Other information
- Boxing record from BoxRec
- Last updated on: 28 January 2017

Anthony McCracken (born 11 January 1983, Sydney, Australia) is a retired Australian professional boxer.

The biggest win in McCracken's career was against David Aloua in their second fight in November 2014, to win the WBA Pan African, WBC – OPBF and WBO Asia Pacific Cruiserweight title. With this McCraken received a top 15 ranking in WBA, WBO and top 40 in WBC and IBO. Aloua defeated McCracken in April 2012 in their first fight. There was a contract clause where if McCracken won the bout, the two must fight again for a trilogy, however the fight did not end up happening as boxing boxers retired.

McCracken has been offered a world title fight in the past, however he turned it down due to himself not feeling ready and instead went to fought in New Zealand against in March 2015. McCracken as not fought since his three title defense in New Zealand against Samoan Vaitele Soi.

== Professional boxing titles ==
- Australian New South Wales State
  - Australian New South Wales State cruiserweight title (188½ Ibs)
- World Boxing Foundation
  - WBF Asia Pacific cruiserweight title (199 Ibs)
- World Boxing Council
  - Oriental and Pacific Boxing Federation cruiserweight title (196½ Ibs)
- World Boxing Association
  - WBA Pan African cruiserweight title (196½ Ibs)
- World Boxing Organisation
  - WBO Asia Pacific cruiserweight title (196½ Ibs)

== Professional boxing record ==
26 fights	18 wins	7 losses
By knockout	8	1
By decision	10	6
Draws	1	

No.	Result	Record	Opponent	Type	Round, time	Date	Location	Notes
26	Win	18–7–1	(Samoa) Vaitele Soi	UD	10	28 March 2015	Horncastle Arena, Christchurch, New Zealand	WBA Pan African & WBC – OPBF & WBO Asia Pacific cruiserweight titles
25	Win	17–7–1	(New Zealand) David Aloua	TKO	7 (10) 2:45	22 November 2014	North Shore Event Centre, North Shore, New Zealand	WBA Pan African & WBC – OPBF & WBO Asia Pacific cruiserweight titles
24	Win	16–7–1	(Australia) Kurtis Pegoraro	MD	4	18 October 2014	Bolton Park Sports Stadium, Wagga Wagga, New South Wales, Australia	
23	Win	15–7–1	(Australia) Peter Brennan	KO	3 (6) 1:09	22 February 2014	Bolton Park Sports Stadium, Wagga Wagga, New South Wales, Australia	
22	Lose	14–7–1	(Australia) Daniel Ammann	UD	10	16 June 2012	Newcastle Panthers Club, Newcastle, New South Wales, Australia	Australian cruiserweight title
21	Lose	14–6–1	(New Zealand) David Aloua	SD	10	13 April 2012	Tattersalls Club, Brisbane, Queensland, Australia	vacant World Professional Boxing Federation Asia Pacific cruiserweight title
20	Win	14–5–1	(Australia) Shane Tilyard	TKO	4 (6) 2:59	30 November 2011	Challenge Stadium, Mt Claremont, Western Australia, Australia	
19	Draw	13–5–1	(Algeria) Mohamed Azzaoui	TD	1 (12) 2:50	1 April 2011	Bolton Park Sports Stadium, Wagga Wagga, New South Wales, Australia	vacant WBA – PABA cruiserweight title
18	Lose	13–5	(New Zealand) Shane Cameron	UD	12	17 November 2010	Challenge Stadium, Mt Claremont, Western Australia, Australia	vacant International Boxing Organization Asia Pacific cruiserweight title Final Eliminator for the Commonwealth Cruiserweight Championship
17	Win	13–4	(Tonga) Walter Pupu'a	TKO	5 (10) 2:41	17 July 2010	Bolton Park Sports Stadium, Wagga Wagga, New South Wales, Australia	vacant World Boxing Foundation Asia Pacific cruiserweight title
16	Win	12–4	(Australia) Dominic Vea	SD	8	8 April 2010	Le Montage, Lilyfield, New South Wales, Australia	
15	Lose	11–4	(New Zealand) Adam Forsyth	UD	8	13 November 2009	Brisbane Convention Centre, South Brisbane, Queensland, Australia	
14	Win	11–3	(Fiji) Oscar Talemaira	TKO	2 (8) 1:11	23 October 2009	Kyeamba Smith Hall, Wagga Wagga, New South Wales, Australia	
13	Lose	10–3	(Australia) Dominic Vea	KO	7 (8) 2:39	9 July 2009	Luna Park, Sydney, New South Wales, Australia	
12	Win	10–2	(Hungary) Balazs Varga	UD	6	20 February 2009	Southport RSL Club, Southport, Queensland, Australia	
11	Win	9–2	(Australia) Kim Heta	UD	6	14 November 2008	Town Hall, Coburg, Victoria, Australia	
10	Win	8–2	(Hungary) Balazs Varga	UD	6	13 July 2008	Coburg Basketball Stadium, Coburg, Victoria, Australia	
9	Lose	7–2	(Australia) Daniel Ammann	UD	10	31 August 2007	Newcastle Panthers Club, Newcastle, New South Wales, Australia	Australian cruiserweight title
8	Win	7–1	(Australia) Dennis Arthur	UD	8	21 July 2007	Bolton Park Sports Stadium, Wagga Wagga, New South Wales, Australia	
7	Lose	6–1	(Australia) Jamie Withers	UD	6	27 June 2007	Gold Coast Convention Centre, Broadbeach, Queensland, Australia	
6	Win	6–0	(Australia) Damien Smith	KO	8 (8) 1:03	17 March 2007	Bolton Park Sports Stadium, Wagga Wagga, New South Wales, Australia	vacant Australia – New South Wales State cruiserweight title
5	Win	5–0	(Australia) Joel Bourke	UD	4	21 January 2007	State Netball & Hockey Centre, Parkville, Victoria, Australia	
4	Win	4–0	(Australia) Joel Bourke	MD	6	15 December 2006	Fraternity Bowling Club, Fairy Meadow, New South Wales, Australia	
3	Win	3–0	(Australia) Jason Larsen	KO	2 (6) 0:33	22 September 2006	Southport Sharks AFL Club, Southport, Queensland, Australia	
2	Win	2–0	(Australia) Sam Hamze	TKO	2 (4) 0:56	15 July 2006	Badminton Stadium, Ballarat, Victoria, Australia	
1	Win	1–0	(Australia) Michael O'Donnell	UD	4	17 June 2006	Newcastle Panthers Club, Newcastle, New South Wales, Australia	Professional debut
