= Thamsanqa Dube =

Zimbabwean boxer

Thamsanqa Dube is, since 2003, the heavyweight boxing champion of Zimbabwe. In November 2003, in Bulawayo, Dube beat Arigoma Chiponda with a technical knockout taking the heavyweight national championship belt. Dube beat Chiponda three more times in the next year. Dube has only lost once in his professional career, and that was by decision in his first match against Chiponda on the day he turned professional.

On 1 January 2006 Dube knocked out a Zambian heavyweight, Joseph "Ramos" Phiri, in a 12-round contest at the Bulawayo Polytechnic College.
