= Tony Conquest =

English boxer

Personal information
- Nickname: Conqueror
- Nationality: English
- Born: 7 July 1984 (age 42) Romford, London, England
- Height: 6 ft 2 1/2 in (189 cm)
- Weight: Cruiserweight

Boxing career
- Stance: Orthodox

Boxing record
- Total fights: 22
- Wins: 18
- Win by KO: 6
- Losses: 4

Tony Conquest (born 7 July 1984) is an English professional boxer who held the Commonwealth cruiserweight title in 2014. He also held the Southern Area and WBO International cruiserweight titles in 2012.
