= Brad Pitt (boxer) =

Australian boxer (born 1981)

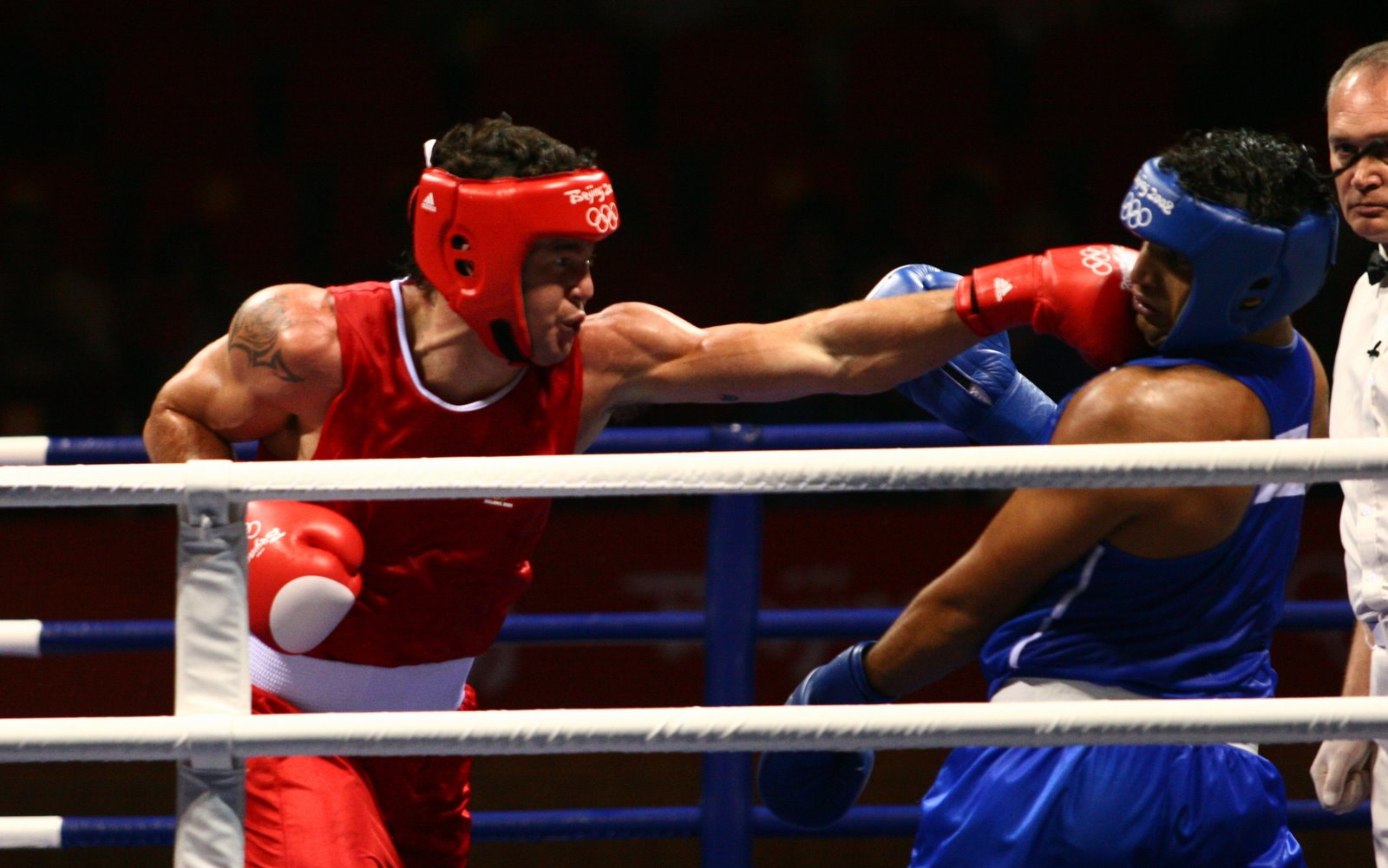
- Brad Pitt vs Rasheed Baloch

Personal information
- Nickname: Hollywood
- Nationality: Australia
- Born: Bradley Michael Pitt; 8 November 1981 (age 45) Blairgowrie, Victoria, Australia
- Height: 1.88 m (6 ft 2 in)
- Weight: 200 lb (91 kg)

Boxing career
- Reach: 75 in (190 cm)
- Stance: Orthodox

Boxing record
- Total fights: 20
- Wins: 19
- Win by KO: 12
- Losses: 1
Medal record
Men's amateur boxing
Representing Australia
Commonwealth Games
Gold medal – first place	2006 Melbourne	Heavyweight

Bradley Michael Pitt (born 8 November 1981), also known as "Hollywood", is an Australian boxer best known for winning the Heavyweight Gold at the 2006 Commonwealth Games and for qualifying for the 2008 Olympics.

== Amateur career ==
Because of his famous namesake, Brad Pitt is nicknamed "Hollywood". He quit his job as a painter in order to train for the 2000 Sydney Olympics, but did not qualify. He returned to painting but again quit, this time to focus on the 2006 Commonwealth Games in Melbourne.

On 6 March 2006, Pitt won the Heavyweight (199 lbs.) gold medal at the 2006 Commonwealth Games in Melbourne, after he beat Danny Price in the first round; James Wasao, Awusone Yekeni and Harpreet Singh in the final. In this fight, Pitt was taunted by Singh. Following the taunts, he knocked Singh out in three punches. On 6 August, Pitt lost at the Nationals in Darwin to 2004 Olympian Adam Forsyth 35:45.

At the 2008 World Amateur Boxing Championships Pitt lost his match to Yushan Nijiati. In 2008 Pitt qualified for the Olympics at the Oceanian Championships, beating Adam Forsyth. At the Olympics Pitt was beaten by Mohamed Arjaoui 6:11.

He was an Australian Institute of Sport scholarship holder.

== Professional boxing record ==
20 fights	19 wins	1 loss
By knockout	12	1
By decision	7	0

No.	Result	Record	Opponent	Type	Round, time	Date	Location	Notes
20	Win	19―1	Jorge Rodriguez Olivera	UD	10 (10)	21 May 2016	The Melbourne Pavilion, Flemington, Victoria, Australia	
19	Win	18―1	Vaitele Soi	MD	3 (3)	22 Nov 2014	North Shore Event Centre, North Shore, New Zealand	
18	Win	17―1	Daniel Ammann	UD	3 (3)	22 Nov 2014	North Shore Event Centre, North Shore, New Zealand	
17	Win	16―1	Joseph Kwadjo	UD	3 (3)	22 Nov 2014	North Shore Event Centre, North Shore, New Zealand	
16	Loss	15―1	David Aloua	KO	4 (12), 1:50	9 Apr 2014	Entertainment Centre, Newcastle, New South Wales, Australia	Lost IBO Asia Pacific cruiser title
15	Win	15―0	Emosi Solitua	KO	1 (6), 2:42	19 Feb 2014	Horden Pavilion, Moore Park, New South Wales, Australia	
14	Win	14―0	Mosese Sorovi	TKO	2 (6)	21 Nov 2012	Hisense Arena, Melbourne, Australia	
13	Win	13―0	Joel Casey	UD	6 (6)	18 May 2012	The Melbourne Pavilion, Flemington, Victoria, Australia	
12	Win	12―0	Victor Oganov	TKO	5 (12), 2:56	18 Nov 2011	The Melbourne Pavilion, Flemington, Victoria, Australia	Won vacant IBO Asia Pacific cruiser title and vacant OPBF cruiser title
11	Win	11―0	Hugo Sclarandi	KO	4 (10), 2:36	18 Nov 2011	Bruno Gym, Rosebud, Victoria, Australia	Won vacant Victoria State heavy title
10	Win	10―0	Fatu Tuimanono	TKO	1 (6), 2:28	10 Sep 2011	Roxy Hotel, Parramatta, Australia	
9	Win	9―0	Eduardo Jesus Oscar Rojas	TKO	2 (6), 0:38	5 Aug 2011	The Melbourne Pavilion, Flemington, Victoria, Australia	
8	Win	8―0	Daniel Ammann	KO	2 (10), 1:45	12 May 2011	The Melbourne Pavilion, Flemington, Victoria, Australia	Won Australian cruiser title
7	Win	7―0	Joshua Harris	UD	6 (6)	26 Feb 2011	Heartland Events Center, Grand Island, Nebraska, USA	
6	Win	6―0	Walter Pupu'a	TKO	3 (8), 2:15	20 Aug 2010	Racecourse – Atrium Room, Flemington, Victoria, Australia	
5	Win	5―0	Oscar Siale	KO	3 (6)	21 Jul 2010	Challenge Stadium, Perth, Australia	
4	Win	4―0	Rasheed Baloch	KO	2 (6), 0:36	30 Apr 2010	Assyrian Sports & Culture Club, Fairfield Heights, New South Wales, Australia	
3	Win	3―0	Helmaloto Manukailea	UD	4 (4)	27 Nov 2009	Gold Coast Convention Centre, Broadbeach, Queensland, Australia	
2	Win	2―0	Atalili Fai	TKO	2 (6), 0:58	13 Nov 2009	Brisbane Convention Centre, Brisbane, Australia	
1	Win	1―0	Shaun Salisbury	KO	1 (6), 1:32	25 Sep 2009	Prestige Warehouse, Port Melbourne, Australia	
