= Joseph Kwadjo =

Ghanaian boxer

- Born: 6 June 1985 (age 41); Ghana
- Other names: Pride of Osu
- Nationality: (Ghana)
- Height: 1.80 m (5 ft 11 in)
- Weight: 74.6 kg (164 lb; 11.75 st)
- Division: Super middleweight
- Stance: Orthodox
- Team: Team Kwadjo
- Trainer: Gyan Singh

Professional boxing record
- Total: 37
- Wins: 24
- By knockout: 19
- Losses: 11
- By knockout: 0
- No contests: 2

Other information
- Occupation: boxer
- Boxing record from BoxRec

Joseph Kwadjo is a former Universal Boxing Organisation (UBO) Intercontinental and IBF Australasian Super middleweight champion.
