= Demsey McKean =

Australian boxer (born 1990)

- Born: 25 September 1990 (age 36); Ipswich, Queensland, Australia
- Height: 198 cm (6 ft 6 in)
- Weight: 112 kg (247 lb; 17 st 9 lb)
- Division: Heavyweight
- Reach: 199 cm (78.3 in)
- Style: Boxing; MMA
- Rank: 32
- Years active: 2014–present

Professional boxing record
- Total: 27
- Wins: 25
- By knockout: 17
- Losses: 2
- By knockout: 2

Kickboxing record
- Total: 4
- Wins: 4
- Losses: 0
- Draws: 0

Mixed martial arts record
- Total: 3
- Wins: 2
- By submission: 1
- By decision: 1
- Losses: 1
- By submission: 1

Amateur record
- Total: 1
- Wins: 1
- By submission: 1
- Losses: 0

Other information
- Occupation: Boxer
- Boxing record from BoxRec
- Mixed martial arts record from Sherdog
- Last updated on: 6 November 2021

Demsey McKean (born 25 September 1990) is an Australian professional boxer, former mixed martial arts fighter and former Muay Thai fighter.

McKean's first major title bout in his career saw him defeat Australian boxer Willie Nasio for the Australian National heavyweight title. McKean won the bout by TKO. His first introduction into the rankings came after defeating Patrick Eneanya and Jonathan Rice. McKean has also been a sparring partner to two-time unified world heavyweight champion Anthony Joshua, and also to interim WBC heavyweight champion Dillian Whyte.

== Early life ==
From the age of six, McKean played Rugby union and Rugby League. He fell in love with combat sports when he first watched UFC at the age of 19. Shortly after, he joined an MMA gym and had his first MMA fight eight months after joining. For a couple of years McKean fought in both MMA and Muay Thai with only one defeat in all combat sports.

== Professional boxing career ==
=== Professional boxing debut to tournament winner (2014–2016) ===
McKean made his professional boxing debut on 31 October 2014 against Luke Barclay on the Alex Leapai vs Malik Scott undercard at Logan Metro Sports Centre, Crestmead, Queensland, Australia. Prior to this fight, McKean had no amateur boxing experience. McKean won the fight by unanimous decision with him winning all four rounds. McKean fought three times in 2015, all under his new promoter Angelo Di Carlo. McKean won all three fights.

In March 2016, McKean fought Anthony Fowler for the second time, but this time for the Queensland State heavyweight title. McKean won the fight by knockout, securing his first boxing title of his career. In April 2016, McKean took part in the annual eight man tournament, The Frank Bianco Cup. As well as McKean, the participants included UFC fighter Tai Tuivasa, Ben Sosoli, New Zealander David Tuitupou, New Zealander Elijah Tevaga Sa'lesui, James Cook, Steven Parima, Rhys Sullivan and Hamad Alloush. McKean stopped James Cook in the 3rd round in the quarter-finals, won by unanimous decision against Elijah Tevaga Sa'lesui in the semi-finals and won by unanimous decision against UFC Fighter Tai Tuivasa in the finals to win the $15,000 and the Frank Bianco Cup. McKean finished up his 2016 with a unanimous decision win against Hunter Sam.

=== Becoming National Champion (2017) ===
In March 2017, McKean fought in a rematch against Hunter Sam for the Interim Australian national heavyweight title. At the time the full champion was New Zealand born Will Nasio who was not able to compete. Hunter Sam is a former Australian Champion himself. During the fight Hunter Sam was deducted a point in the first and seventh round for illegal low blows landed against McKean. McKean won the fight by stopping his opponent in the tenth and final round. In July 2017, McKean called out the full Australian National Champion Will Nasio which was televised on TV. In the video McKean says Will Nasio has pulled out of three contracts in the past with this being McKean's fourth call out. The call out worked as the fight was set to happen in October 2017. McKean won the fight by stoppage in the sixth round making McKean the undisputed Australian national heavyweight champion.

=== 2018–2019 ===
Due to an injury that was caused in the Will Nasio fight, McKean had to take a year off from boxing due to ligament replacement in his left knuckle. Due to the injury, McKean had to turn down a lot of major international boxing fights including some in Canada for the Commonwealth title. In late 2018, McKean began to fight more international opponents with the first opponent being the Russian born Australian boxer and former IBO World title contender Victor Oganov. McKean won the fight by sixth round stoppage. McKean finished his 2018 with a fight against Nigerian born Australian and former IBF Pan Pacific champion Roger Izonritei. This is also the first Australian national title defence for McKean since winning the title the year prior. McKean won the fight by corner retirement with McKean successfully defending his Australian title.

In March 2019, McKean made his in ring return. Originally he was scheduled to fight Brazilian Robson Bambu, however, due to visa issues he was replaced by Brazilian boxer and former WBO Latino champion Marcelo Nascimento. McKean won the fight by stoppage in the second round. McKean was originally booked to take on Solomon Haumono on 8 June 2019, however, Haumono withdrew from the fight. American Curtis Harper was originally going to be the replacement until he also withdrew. In the end McKean fought Czech Republic boxer Dominik Musil. McKean won the fight by knockout in the second round.

In September 2019, McKean was booked to fight for major regional title against Nigerian born Australian Patrick Eneanya for the vacant WBO African heavyweight title. The fight was in jeopardy when McKean was hospitalized the day of the fight. McKean admitted that he wasn't eating right, and was indulging in junk food. However he was healthy enough to compete that day which led to him winning by sixth round stoppage, winning the WBO African title. A month after the fight, McKean got his first taste of rankings, receiving the WBO ranking in October 2019 and being ranked 14th. McKean finished his 2019 with a fight against Northern Ireland born Australian Scott Belshaw. McKean won the fight by third-round knockout.

=== World rankings (2020) ===
Throughout the end of 2019, negotiations were happening to have Demsey McKean fight former WBA World Heavyweight Champion Lucas Browne. Lucas Browne agreed with McKean promoter Angelo Di Carlo for a March 2020 fight. Unfortunately in December 2019 it was announced that Lucas Browne withdrew from the fight. Instead of taking on Lucas Browne, McKean took on American boxer Jonathan Rice in the biggest fight of his career for two major regional titles, the WBO Asia Pacific heavyweight title and IBF Intercontinental heavyweight title. McKean said he started eating better and training better leading into this fight. Jonathan Rice spoke a lot of trash talk in their upcoming fight, but McKean didn't care for it. McKean won the fight by tenth round stoppage in the last 20 seconds of the fight with McKean winning the WBO Asia Pacific and IBF Intercontinental heavyweight titles.

Due to COVID-19 pandemic in Australia and across the world, fewer events were happening across the world which made boxers less active including McKean. McKean wouldn't be back in the ring until May 2021. In May 2020, McKean called out Joseph Parker to take him on in his next fight. McKean obviously backing himself, believed that being southpaw would give him the advantage over Parker. In July 2020, McKean continued to call out Joseph Parker but had no intentions to disrespect him. In October 2020, McKean expressed his interest in fighting Efe Ajagba, a boxer who had also fought and defeated Jonathan Rice. McKean was also interested in fighting the winner of Joseph Parker vs. Junior Fa. McKean had also shown interest in fighting Tyson Fury. McKean held talks with Filip Hrgovic for an IBF final eliminator. In August 2021, McKean was offered sparring with Anthony Joshua in the UK. Not only did McKean accept the offer, he also relocated to the UK in the hope of getting more active, especially with the Covid pandemic and less activity in Australia. In September 2021, McKean called out Joseph Parker again stating "That's what everyone wants to see".

=== 2023 ===
On the undercard of Anthony Joshua vs. Robert Helenius on 12 August 2023, at The O2 Arena in London, England, McKean faced Croatian Filip Hrgovic (15–0, 12 KOs). McKean lost by TKO in the 12th round.

=== 2024 ===
McKean was stopped by Moses Itauma in the first round on 21 December 2024, at Kingdom Arena in Riyadh, Saudi Arabia in a fight which was part of the undercard for the heavyweight world title rematch between Oleksandr Usyk and Tyson Fury.

=== 2025 ===
In July 2025 McKean returned to Australia. In his first fight back on home soil he finished Petero Qica within the 1st round securing the TKO victory.

=== 2026 ===
On the 16th of January 2026, McKean faced Toese Vousiutu in the co main event on the Tim Tszyu vs Michael Zeraffa card. Finishing the fight in the 7th round via TKO

On the 24th of June Mckean fought Liam Talivaa for the IBF Pan Pacific Heavyweight Title, he won via 4th round TKO

== Professional boxing titles ==
- Australian Queensland State
  - Australia – Queensland State heavyweight title
- Frank Bianco Cup
  - 2016 Eight man heavyweight tournament winner
- Australian National Boxing Federation
  - Interim Australian National heavyweight title
  - Australian National heavyweight title
- World Boxing Organisation
  - African heavyweight title
  - Asia Pacific heavyweight title
- International Boxing Federation
  - Inter-Continental heavyweight title

== Professional boxing record ==
| 27 fights | 25 wins | 2 losses |
|---|---|---|
| By knockout | 17 | 2 |
| By decision | 8 | 0 |

| No. | Result | Record | Opponent | Type | Round, time | Date | Location | Notes |
|---|---|---|---|---|---|---|---|---|
| 27 | Win | 25–2 | Liam Talivaa | TKO | 4 (10), 1:35 | 24 Jun 2026 | Pat Rafter arena, Victoria, Australia | Won vacant BF Pan Pacific heavyweight Title |
| 26 | Win | 24–2 | Toese Vousiutu | TKO | 7 (8), 1:27 | 16 Jan 2026 | Brisbane Entertainment Centre, Brisbane, Australia | |
| 25 | Win | 23–2 | Petero Qica | TKO | 1 (10), 2:14 | 25 July 2025 | Southport RSL Club, Southport, Australia | |
| 24 | Loss | 22–2 | Moses Itauma | TKO | 1 (10), 1:57 | 21 Dec 2024 | Kingdom Arena, Riyadh, Saudi Arabia | For WBO Inter-Continental, vacant WBA International and Commonwealth Silver heavyweight titles |
| 23 | Loss | 22–1 | Filip Hrgović | TKO | 12 (12), 1:01 | 12 Aug 2023 | The O2 Arena, London, England | |
| 22 | Win | 22–0 | Patrick Korte | KO | 3 (10), 2:59 | 15 Oct 2022 | South Bank Piazza, South Brisbane, Australia | Won vacant IBF Inter-Continental heavyweight title |
| 21 | Win | 21–0 | Ariel Esteban Bracamonte | PTS | 8 | 27 Feb 2022 | The O2 Arena, London, England | |
| 20 | Win | 20–0 | Don Haynesworth | TKO | 6 (8), 0:27 | 19 Nov 2021 | SNHU Arena, Manchester, New Hampshire, US | |
| 19 | Win | 19–0 | Kiki Toa Leutele | UD | 10 | 15 May 2021 | Mansfield Tavern, Brisbane, Australia | |
| 18 | Win | 18–0 | Jonathan Rice | TKO | 10 (10), 2:58 | 7 Mar 2020 | The Star, Gold Coast, Australia | Won vacant WBO Asia Pacific and IBF Inter-Continental heavyweight titles |
| 17 | Win | 17–0 | Scott Belshaw | TKO | 3 (5), 2:52 | 8 Nov 2019 | Eatons Hill Hotel, Brisbane, Australia | |
| 16 | Win | 16–0 | Patrick Eneanya | TKO | 6 (10), 0:59 | 21 Sep 2019 | Southport Australian Football Club, Gold Coast, Australia | Won vacant WBO Africa heavyweight title |
| 15 | Win | 15–0 | Dominik Musil | KO | 2 (8), 2:19 | 8 Jun 2019 | The Star, Gold Coast, Australia | |
| 14 | Win | 14–0 | Marcelo Nascimento | TKO | 2 (8), 1:28 | 16 Mar 2019 | Southport Australian Football Club, Gold Coast, Australia | |
| 13 | Win | 13–0 | Roger Izonritei | TKO | 4 (10), 3:00 | 8 Dec 2018 | Southport Australian Football Club, Gold Coast, Australia | Retained Australian heavyweight title |
| 12 | Win | 12–0 | Victor Oganov | TKO | 6 (8), 1:34 | 13 Oct 2018 | Brisbane Convention & Exhibition Centre, Brisbane, Australia | |
| 11 | Win | 11–0 | Willie Nasio | TKO | 6 (10), 0:51 | 6 Oct 2017 | Melbourne Pavilion, Melbourne, Australia | Won Australian heavyweight title |
| 10 | Win | 10–0 | Hunter Sam | TKO | 10 (10), 2:49 | 24 Mar 2017 | Civic Centre, Ipswich, Australia | Won vacant Australian interim heavyweight title |
| 9 | Win | 9–0 | Hunter Sam | UD | 6 | 3 Dec 2016 | Mansfield Tavern, Brisbane, Australia | |
| 8 | Win | 8–0 | Tai Tuivasa | UD | 3 | 15 Apr 2016 | Melbourne Pavilion, Melbourne, Australia | Frank Bianco Cup: heavyweight final |
| 7 | Win | 7–0 | Elijah Salesui | UD | 3 | 15 Apr 2016 | Melbourne Pavilion, Melbourne, Australia | Frank Bianco Cup: heavyweight semi-final |
| 6 | Win | 6–0 | James Cook | TKO | 3 (3), 1:56 | 15 Apr 2016 | Melbourne Pavilion, Melbourne, Australia | Frank Bianco Cup: heavyweight quarter-final |
| 5 | Win | 5–0 | Anthony Fowler | KO | 3 (8), 0:36 | 5 Mar 2016 | Mansfield Tavern, Brisbane, Australia | Won vacant Australian Queensland State heavyweight title |
| 4 | Win | 4–0 | Anthony Fowler | TKO | 2 (4), 1:20 | 4 Dec 2015 | Eatons Hill Hotel, Brisbane, Australia | |
| 3 | Win | 3–0 | Filipo Fonoti Masoe | UD | 4 | 29 Aug 2015 | Mansfield Tavern, Brisbane, Australia | |
| 2 | Win | 2–0 | Leon Valusaga | UD | 4 | 7 Aug 2015 | Mansfield Tavern, Brisbane, Australia | |
| 1 | Win | 1–0 | Luke Barclay | UD | 4 | 31 Oct 2014 | Metro Sports Centre, Logan, Australia | |

== Mixed martial arts record ==
Professional record breakdown
| 3 matches | 2 wins | 1 loss |
| By submission | 1 | 1 |
| By decision | 1 | 0 |

| Res. | Record | Opponent | Method | Event | Date | Round | Time | Location | Notes |
|---|---|---|---|---|---|---|---|---|---|
| Win | 2–1 | Peter Klaricich | Submission (armbar) | FWC 7 - FightWorld Cup 7 | 20 November 2010 | 2 | 2:54 | Nerang Police Citizens Youth Club, Nerang, Queensland, Australia | |
| Loss | 1–1 | Semir Celikovic | Submission (rear-naked choke) | FWC 6 - To The Winner Go The Spoils | 7 August 2010 | 1 | 1:44 | Nerang Police Citizens Youth Club, Nerang, Queensland, Australia | |
| Win | 1–0 | Josh Hansson | Decision (majority) | FWC 5 - Call to Arms | 10 April 2010 | 3 | 3:00 | Nerang Police Citizens Youth Club, Nerang, Queensland, Australia | |
