= St. Gall (disambiguation) =

St. Gall may refer to:

- Saint Gall, Irish missionary in the German Alps
- Abbey of Saint Gall, Switzerland
- Sankt Gallen (disambiguation), various German-language eponyms of the saint
- St. Gallen, a city of Switzerland, whose English spelling is St Gall, and whose French name is Saint-Gall
- Gal I (Bishop of Clermont) (c.489–c.553)

== See also ==
- Saint-Gall Cantatorium, the earliest surviving cantatorium of Gregorian chant.
- Gall (disambiguation)
