= Gallen =

Gallen may refer to:

Places

- Gallen (barony), a barony in Ireland
- Sankt Gallen (disambiguation), various locations in German-speaking countries

People

- Saint Gall, Irish missionary, Sankt Gallus in German
- Conal Gallen (b. 1955), Irish singer/comedian
- Herbert Gallen (1915–2007), American fashion businessman
- Hugh Gallen (1924–1982), Governor of New Hampshire, USA
- James Gallen (1928–2012), American politician
- Jarl Gallén (1908–90), Finnish historian
- Joel Gallen, American filmmaker
- Kevin Gallen (b. 1975), English association footballer
- Laurie Gallen (b. 1962), New Zealand field hockey player
- Oisín Gallen, Irish Gaelic footballer
- Paul Gallen (b. 1981), Australian rugby league player
- Ricardo Gallén (b. 1972), Spanish classical guitar player
- Thomas Gallen (1932–2025), American jurist and politician in Florida
- Zac Gallen (b. 1995), American baseball player
- Gallen Lo (b. 1962), Hong Kong actor

== See also ==
- Galen
- Gallon
- Galena
- Gallienus
- Gallen-Kallela
