= Sankt Gallen =

Sankt Gallen, or St. Gallen, may refer to:

- St. Gallen, a city in Switzerland
  - Abbey of Saint Gall
  - St. Gallen railway station
- Canton of St. Gallen, Switzerland
- Sankt Gallen, Styria, a municipality in Austria
- St. Gall (disambiguation)

== See also ==
- Gallen (disambiguation)
- St. Gallenkappel, a former municipality in the canton of St. Gallen
- Sankt Gallenkirch, a municipality in Vorarlberg, Austria
