= Solomon Haumono =

Rugby league footballer and boxer (born 1975)

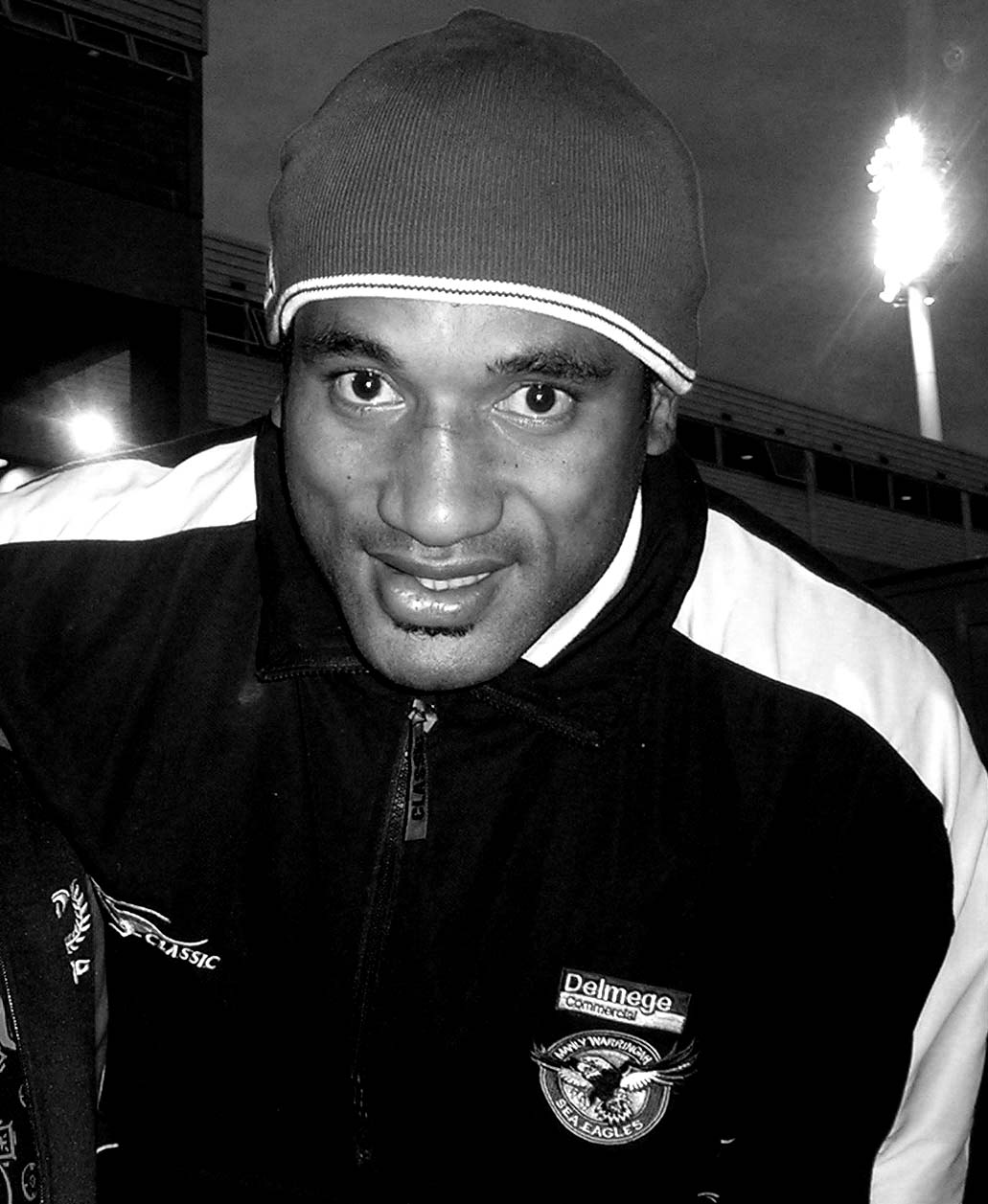

Personal information
- Born: 13 October 1975 (age 51) Auckland, New Zealand

Playing information
- Height: 188 cm (6 ft 2 in)
- Weight: 111 kg (17 st 7 lb)
- Position: Prop, Second-row
Club
Years	Team	Pld	T	G	FG	P
1994–96	Manly Sea Eagles	39	6	0	0	24
1997–98	Canterbury Bulldogs	25	7	0	0	28
1999	Balmain Tigers	8	1	0	0	4
2000	St. George Illawarra	2	0	0	0	0
2003–04	Manly Sea Eagles	37	1	0	0	4
2005–06	London Broncos	48	15	0	0	60
	Total	159	30	0	0	120
Representative
Years	Team	Pld	T	G	FG	P
2003	NSW City	1	0	0	0	0
1997	New Sth Wales (SL)	3	0	0	0	0
1997	Australia (SL)	1	0	0	0	0
1995–06	Tonga	2	0	0	0	0
- Boxing career
- Nickname: Solo
- Nationality: Tonga
- Weight: Heavyweight
- Stance: Orthodox

Boxing record
- Total fights: 30
- Wins: 24
- Win by KO: 21
- Losses: 4
- Draws: 2

Solomon Haumono (Tongan: Solomone Haumono; born 13 October 1975) is an Australian former professional boxer and rugby league player.

== Early life ==
He attended Newtown Boys High School, Newtown, New South Wales. He then went on to Christian Brothers' High School, Lewisham and represented them in the New South Wales Combined Catholic Colleges Australian Schoolboys team 1993.

== Rugby league career ==
In rugby league, his preferred position was second-row. He played in the NRL for the Manly-Warringah Sea Eagles, the Canterbury-Bankstown Bulldogs, the Balmain Tigers, the St George Illawarra Dragons, and in the Super League for the London Broncos/Harlequins RL. Haumono played at representative level for New South Wales and Australia, although these three state matches and one international match were in 1997, when Super League contracted players were ineligible for State of Origin selection. He also captained Tonga.

Haumono made his first grade debut for Manly-Warringah in round 11, 1994 against Balmain, coming off the bench in a 42–0 victory at Leichhardt Oval. In 1995, Haumono featured heavily in the Manly side which won the minor premiership having lost only 2 matches all year. Haumono played from the bench in Manly's shock grand final loss to Canterbury. In 1996, Haumono played 14 games but missed out on selection in Manly's premiership winning side which defeated St. George in the grand final.

In 1997, Haumono signed with Canterbury who aligned themselves with the rival Super League competition during the Super League war. During the 1998 NRL season, Haumono walked out on Canterbury midway through the year after devising a plan to get out of his contract with the club. Haumono's plan was to join his supposed girlfriend Gabrielle Richens in England. Haumono elaborated on the plan saying "I was under contract for the Bulldogs so it was decided to come up with a plan that would ultimately force the Bulldogs to rip up my contract, So the plan was formed that I was going to chase after my girlfriend at the time in England. So off I went and before I knew it, the paper got a hold of it and blew it up, making headline news and myself being chased by the media at home and even there in London".

The plan was devised by Haumono and close friend Anthony Mundine but fell over when Canterbury got wind of the plot and instead fined Haumono and put him in reserve grade.

In 1999, Haumono signed with Balmain. Haumono only made 8 appearances for Balmain due to an elbow injury. In 2000, Haumono joined St George but only featured in 2 games, the last of which was the club's humiliating 70–10 loss against Melbourne at the Melbourne Cricket Ground.

=== Return to League ===
Following a second spell with Manly in 2003, Haumono joined the London Broncos and played in the capital for two seasons. In December 2006, with a year remaining on his contract, Haumono quit rugby league to return to professional boxing.

== Boxing career ==
=== 2000 to 2002 ===
Haumono first took time out of rugby league after his spell with the St George Illawarra Dragons in 2000. He followed in the footsteps of his father (Australian former heavyweight champion Maile Haumono) to take up a career in professional boxing. He fought eight times between 2000 and 2002, winning all of his heavyweight contests inside the distance. Haumono briefly held the title of New South Wales heavyweight champion before rejecting an offer to join the stable of American promoter Don King and returning to rugby league.

=== Return to boxing – post 2008 ===
Haumono resumed his boxing career with a first-round knockout on 7 March 2007. He began training under trainer Johnny Lewis who has assisted Haumono in reaching his 14–0 (14 KOs) record in the heavyweight ranks. He fought Cliff Couser on 27 August 2008 and won the fight by unanimous decision. He fought Colin Wilson on 11 March 2009 with the fight going to a draw after ten rounds. Solomon won his next fight by disqualification on 16 May 2009 against Royce Sio (1–0–0). Haumono was floored in the eleventh second of the first round by a right hook from Sio, but Sio then leaned down and hit Haumono again while Haumono's back was on the ground, leading to an instant disqualification. Haumono was back on his feet a few seconds later.

Haumono fought Justin Whitehead on 16 August 2009 and lost for the first time in his career by split decision. He defeated Michael Kirby by tenth-round TKO for the OPBF Heavyweight Title on 18 September 2009, and became the Australian Heavyweight Champion after a tenth-round TKO of Franklin Egobi in Melbourne on 7 September 2012.

On 31 December 2012, he fought K-1 legend Kyotaro Fuijmoto under boxing rules, defeating him in the fifth round via technical knockout.

On 28 April 2013, he lost by technical to Kevin Johnson.

On 21 July 2016, he lost by technical to Joseph Parker.

== Personal life ==
Haumono is married to Margaret, who is a cousin of his friend and fellow rugby league player-turned boxer Anthony Mundine. Solomon and Margaret have five children.

He dated English model Gabrielle Richens for a period of time during his time with Canterbury.

In 2015, Haumono revealed he had been suffering a drug addiction during his league career. He was addicted to ice, cocaine and ecstasy.

== Professional boxing record ==
30 fights	24 wins	4 losses
By knockout	21	2
By decision	2	2
By disqualification	1	0
Draws	2	

No.	Result	Record	Opponent	Type	Round, time	Date	Location	Notes
30	Loss	24–4–2	Tomasz Adamek	UD	10	24 Jun 2017	Ergo Arena, Gdańsk, Poland	
29	Loss	24–3–2	Joseph Parker	TKO	4 (12), 1:35	21 Jul 2016	Horncastle Arena, Christchurch, New Zealand	For WBC-OPBF and WBO Oriental heavyweight titles
28	Win	24–2–2	Manuel Alberto Pucheta	KO	6 (10), 2:29	27 Apr 2016	Convention & Exhibition Centre, Brisbane, Australia	Retained PABA heavyweight title
27	Win	23–2–2	Hunter Sam	UD	10	30 Oct 2015	National Centre of Indigenous Excellence, Sydney, Australia	Won vacant PABA interim heavyweight title
26	Win	22–2–2	Filipo Fonoti Masoe	KO	4 (6), 2:46	24 Jul 2015	Orange Function Centre, Orange, Australia	
25	Win	21–2–2	Marcelo Nascimento	TKO	3 (8), 0:53	17 Oct 2013	The Melbourne Pavilion, Melbourne, Australia	
24	Loss	20–2–2	Kevin Johnson	KO	10 (12), 2:53	28 Apr 2013	Convention and Exhibition Centre, Melbourne, Australia	Lost WBC-OPBF heavyweight title
23	Win	20–1–2	Kyotaro Fujimoto	TKO	5 (12), 0:57	31 Dec 2012	Bodymaker Colosseum, Osaka, Japan	Won vacant WBC-OPBF heavyweight title
22	Win	19–1–2	Franklin Egobi	TKO	10 (10), 2:05	7 Sep 2012	The Melbourne Pavilion, Melbourne, Australia	Won vacant Australian heavyweight title
21	Draw	18–1–2	Joey Wilson	SD	8	5 Jul 2012	SkyCity Convention Centre, Auckland, New Zealand	
20	Win	18–1–1	Junior Pati	KO	2 (6), 1:02	8 Dec 2011	The Arena, Brisbane, Australia	
19	Win	17–1–1	Michael Kirby	TKO	10 (12), 0:21	18 Sep 2009	Pavilion, Melbourne, Australia	Won WBC-OPBF heavyweight title
18	Loss	16–1–1	Justin Whitehead	SD	10	16 Aug 2009	Peninsula, Shed 14 Central Pier, Docklands, Melbourne, Australia	For vacant WBF (Foundation) International heavyweight title
17	Win	16–0–1	Royce Sio	DQ	1 (6), 0:15	16 May 2009	Blacktown RSL Club, Sydney, Australia	Haumono decked and Sio disqualified for hitting him twice while he lay on the canvas
16	Draw	15–0–1	Colin Wilson	SD	10	11 Mar 2009	The Cube, Sydney, Australia	
15	Win	15–0	Cliff Couser	UD	8	27 Aug 2008	Whitlam Leisure Centre, Sydney, Australia	
14	Win	14–0	Tommy Connelly	TKO	3 (6), 0:27	27 Feb 2008	Entertainment Centre, Sydney, Australia	
13	Win	13–0	Seiaute Ma'ilata	KO	2 (6), 0:40	10 Dec 2007	Entertainment Centre, Sydney, Australia	
12	Win	12–0	Mosese Kavika	KO	1 (6), 1:15	21 Apr 2012	Gold Coast Convention and Exhibition Centre, Broadbeach, Australia	
11	Win	11–0	Oscar Talemaira	TKO	1 (6), 1:37	25 May 2007	Ex-Services Club, Coffs Harbour, Australia	
10	Win	10–0	Alex Mene	TKO	3 (6), 1:07	27 Apr 2007	Magic Millions Complex, Bundall, Australia	
9	Win	9–0	Fatu Tuimanono	KO	1 (4), 1:24	7 Mar 2007	Entertainment Centre, Sydney, Australia	
8	Win	8–0	Fatu Tuimanono	TKO	2 (6)	14 Jun 2002	Enmore Theatre, Sydney, Australia	
7	Win	7–0	Auckland Auimatagi	TKO	6 (10)	10 May 2002	Central Coast Rugby League Club, Gosford, Australia	Retained New South Wales heavyweight title
6	Win	6–0	Shane Wijohn	KO	5 (6)	19 Apr 2002	La Montage Function Centre, Sydney, Australia	
5	Win	5–0	Mark Alexander	TKO	3 (6)	4 Mar 2002	Jupiters Hotel & Casino, Broadbeach, Australia	
4	Win	4–0	John Wyborn	KO	2 (10), 2:31	13 Jul 2001	The Octagon, Sydney, Australia	Won New South Wales heavyweight title
3	Win	3–0	Martin Opetaia	TKO	7 (8)	2 Mar 2001	Star City Casino, Sydney, Australia	
2	Win	2–0	Paul Srama	KO	1 (6)	4 Sep 2000	Hordern Pavilion, Sydney, Australia	
1	Win	1–0	Ken Fuller	KO	2 (4)	3 Jul 2000	Entertainment Centre, Sydney, Australia	

Sporting positions
Regional boxing titles
Preceded by John Wyborn	New South Wales heavyweight champion 13 July 2002 – May 2006; Vacated	Vacant Title next held by Bowie Tupou
Preceded by Michael Kirby	OPBF heavyweight champion 18 September 2009 – December 2012; Vacated	Vacant Title next held by Himself
Vacant Title last held by Lucas Browne	Australian heavyweight champion 7 September 2012 – December 2013; Vacated	Vacant Title next held by Hunter Sam
Vacant Title last held by Himself	OPBF heavyweight champion 31 December 2012 – 28 April 2013	Succeeded by Kevin Johnson
Vacant Title last held by Joseph Parker	PABA heavyweight champion Interim title 30 October 2015 – April 2016; Promoted	Vacant
Vacant Title last held by Joseph Parker	PABA heavyweight champion 27 April 2016 – ? Vacated	Vacant
