= Cantatorium =

A cantatorium is a collection of chants for the Mass and solo pieces for the Liturgy of the Word with simple congregational responses of graduals, alleluias, tracts or cantica.

Cantatorium was also referred to as the book for the soloist who sings gradual and alleluia at the ambo and its function was described by the oldest Ordo, Ordo romanus, as follows: "After the subdeacon has read the Epistle, the cantor ascends to the ambo with his Cantatorium and performs the responsory." It is noted that this definition did not include a description of its contents. Amalarius, in his De ordine antiphhonarii, explained that in Gaul, Cantatorium was called "gradual".

Aside from the chants, the cantatorium also included notations that served as memory aid for cantors and choirs. These notations include the outline of the melody although it did not show precise relative pitch, rhythm or silence. The book is distinguished from the liber Antiphonarius, which contained Introits, Offertories, Communios, and antiphons.

Examples of cantatorium include the Saint-Gall Cantatorium. There is also the Codex Monza, which contained solo chants, alleluias, and Tracts. It is said that it did not have a purely practical function since chants were usually memorized but that it conferred a certain honor to its bearer or indicated an hhonorific symbol of the cantor's function. An account described the cantatorium as richly illuminated and sometimes with a cover of carved ivory.

The cantatorium began to disappear gradually after the eleventh century as it came to be combined with other notated books such as the Troper-Proser.

== Bibliography ==
- Cantatorium et antiphonale missarum, Ecclesia Orans, 1984. cited in : A history of liturgical books from the beginning to the thirteenth century, 1998, Éric Palazzo
- (in French) Les Livres de chant liturgique, Michel Huglo, 1998.
- The cantatorium: from Charlemagne to the Fourteenth century, Michel Huglo, 2001.
