= Doug Sam =

Australian boxer

- Born: Doug Sam; 18 September 1960 (age 66); Australia
- Nationality: Australian
- Weight: 187.75 lb (85 kg; 13 st 6 lb)
- Division: Middleweight; Super Middleweight; Light Heavyweight; Cruiserweight; Heavyweight
- Style: Boxing
- Stance: Orthodox
- Years active: 1982 - 1989, 1992, 2000

Professional boxing record
- Total: 31
- Wins: 24
- By knockout: 21
- Losses: 7
- By knockout: 4
- Draws: 0
- No contests: 0

Other information
- Occupation: Boxer
- Notable relatives: Hunter Sam (Son)
- Boxing record from BoxRec
- Last updated on: 30 January 2017

Doug Sam (born 18 September 1960, Australia) is a retired Australian professional boxer. He lives in Townsville, Australia.

He won the silver medal in the Men's Middleweight at the 1982 Commonwealth Games.

Sam's biggest fight of his career was in 1987 when he fought for the IBF World super middleweight title against South Korean Park Chong-pal. Sam had his last bout in 2000 against New Zealander Ken Suavine, winning his last belt for the Queensland State cruiserweight title. Sam is the father to boxer Hunter Sam.

== Professional boxing titles ==
- Australian National Boxing Federation
  - Australian super middleweight title (167Ibs)
- World Boxing Council
  - OPBF light heavyweight title (174Ibs)
- Australian Queensland State
  - Australia - Queensland State cruiserweight title (187¾Ibs)

== Professional boxing record ==
31 fights	24 wins	7 losses
By knockout	21	4
By decision	3	3
Draws	0	

No.	Result	Record	Opponent	Type	Round, time	Date	Location	Notes
31	Win	24–7	(New Zealand) Ken Suavine	TKO	2 (10)	21 Jul 2000	Ipswich Showgrounds, Ipswich, Queensland, Australia	vacant Australia - Queensland State cruiserweight title
30	Lose	23–7	(Australia) Danny Buzza	PTS	10	15 Apr 2000	Ipswich Showgrounds, Ipswich, Queensland, Australia	Australia - Queensland State heavyweight title
29	Win	23–6	(Australia) Tony Keller	KO	4 (10)	12 Dec 1992	Palm Island, Queensland, Australia	
28	Win	22–6	(Australia) Colin Weetra	TKO	6 (10)	11 Oct 1992	Carrara Sports Complex, Carrara, Gold Coast, Queensland, Australia	
27	Lose	21–6	(Australia) Lou Cafaro	KO	6 (12)	24 Feb 1989	Perth, Western Australia, Australia	Australian super middleweight title
26	Lose	21–5	(Australia) Jeff Harding	TKO	5 (12)	28 Apr 1988	Rosehill Racecourse, Sydney, New South Wales, Australia	WBC - OPBF light heavyweight title
25	Lose	21–4	(United States) Jesse Shelby	UD	10	7 Mar 1988	Entertainment Centre, Sydney, New South Wales, Australia	
24	Win	21–3	(Papua New Guinea) Gary Hubble	KO	11 (12)	4 Aug 1987	Festival Hall, Brisbane, Queensland, Australia	vacant WBC - OPBF light heavyweight title
23	Win	20–3	(Uganda) Emmanuel Otti	TKO	7 (10); 2:54	25 May 1987	Festival Hall, Brisbane, Queensland, Australia	
22	Lose	19–3	(South Korea) Park Chong-pal	TKO	15 (15); 1:55	25 Jan 1987	Hilton Hotel, Seoul, South Korea	IBF World super middleweight title
21	Win	19–2	(Fiji) Elo Raugna	TKO	2 (10)	8 Dec 1986	Festival Hall, Brisbane, Queensland, Australia	
20	Win	18–2	(Fiji) Joe Nitiva	PTS	10	15 Sep 1986	Entertainment Centre, Sydney, New South Wales, Australia	
19	Lose	17–2	(United States) Henry Sims	PTS	10	5 Jul 1986	Noumea, New Caledonia	
18	Win	17–1	(Australia) Wally Carr	KO	5 (10)	18 Apr 1986	Bruce Stadium, Canberra, Australian Capital Territory, Australia	
17	Win	16–1	(Fiji) Lorima Niumataiwalu	TKO	5 (10)	9 Sep 1985	Mansfield Tavern, Mansfield, Queensland, Australia	
16	Win	15–1	(Fiji) Materati Valu	KO	2 (12)	2 Aug 1985	Dapto Rugby League Club, Dapto, New South Wales, Australia	vacant Australian super middleweight title
15	Win	14–1	(Samoa) Johnny Taupau Sr	TKO	4 (6)	26 Apr 1985	Hordern Pavilion, Sydney, New South Wales, Australia	
14	Win	13–1	(Australia) Tommy West	KO	1 (10	20 Feb 1985	Mount Pritchard Community Club, Sydney, New South Wales, Australia	
13	Win	12–1	(Fiji) Joe Nitiva	KO	9 (10)	1 Jun 1984	Festival Hall, Brisbane, Queensland, Australia	
12	Win	11–1	(Indonesia) Suwarno	KO	1 (10); 0:53	16 Apr 1984	Festival Hall, Brisbane, Queensland, Australia	
11	Win	10–1	(Samoa) Fred Taufua	PTS	10	19 Mar 1984	Festival Hall, Brisbane, Queensland, Australia	
10	Win	9–1	(Australia) Ian Dennis	TKO	3 (10)	6 Feb 1984	Festival Hall, Brisbane, Queensland, Australia	
9	Win	8–1	(United States) Jeff Morgan	TKO	4 (10)	28 Nov 1983	Festival Hall, Brisbane, Queensland, Australia	
8	Win	7–1	(Australia) Ricky Patterson	KO	6 (10)	3 Oct 1983	Festival Hall, Brisbane, Queensland, Australia	
7	Win	6–1	(Mexico) Leonardo Bermudez	PTS	10	29 Aug 1983	Festival Hall, Brisbane, Queensland, Australia	
6	Win	5–1	(United Kingdom) Mick Mills	TKO	1 (10) 2:15	25 Jul 1983	Festival Hall, Brisbane, Queensland, Australia	
5	Win	4–1	(Australia) Kelly Thompson	KO	2 (10)	6 Jun 1983	Festival Hall, Brisbane, Queensland, Australia	
4	Lose	3–1	(Australia) Ricky Patterson	TKO	2 (8)	14 Feb 1983	Festival Hall, Brisbane, Queensland, Australia	Broken jaw stoppage
3	Win	3–0	(Fiji) Joe Nitiva	KO	8 (10)	4 Feb 1983	Homestead Hotel, Brisbane, Queensland, Australia	
2	Win	2–0	(Australia) Rodney Roberts	KO	3 (8)	13 Dec 1982	Festival Hall, Brisbane, Queensland, Australia	
1	Win	1–0	(Greece) Manny Trikilis	TKO	3 (6)	8 Nov 1982	Festival Hall, Brisbane, Queensland, Australia	Professional debut
