= Hunter Sam =

Australian boxer (born 1984)

- Born: Hunter Sam; 20 July 1984 (age 42); Palm Island, Queensland, Australia
- Nationality: Australian
- Height: 185 cm (6 ft 1 in)
- Weight: 223.5 lb (101 kg; 16 st 0 lb)
- Division: Heavyweight
- Reach: 195 cm (76.8 in)
- Style: Boxing
- Stance: Orthodox
- Rank: 445th
- Years active: 2008 - Present

Professional boxing record
- Total: 26
- Wins: 11
- By knockout: 4
- Losses: 13
- By knockout: 4
- Draws: 2
- No contests: 0

Other information
- Occupation: Boxer
- Notable relatives: Doug Sam (Father)
- Boxing record from BoxRec
- Last updated on: 27 May 2017

Hunter Sam (born 20 July 1984) is an Australian professional boxer.

Sam has fought multiple credentialed boxers including David Aloua, Kali Meehan, Bowie Tupou (for WBO African title), Solomon Haumono (for WBA PABA title), Willie Nasio and more. Sam is the son of IBF World super middleweight title contender, Doug Sam.

== Professional boxing titles ==
- World Boxing Foundation
  - WBF Asia Pacific heavyweight title (233¾Ibs)
- Australian National Boxing Federation
  - Australian National heavyweight title (239½Ibs)

== Professional boxing record ==
26 fights	11 wins	13 losses
By knockout	4	4
By decision	7	9
Draws	2	

No.	Result	Record	Opponent	Type	Round, time	Date	Location	Notes
26	Loss	11–13–2	Kris Terzievski	TKO	3 (8)	17 Nov 2018	The Melbourne Pavilion, Flemington, Victoria, Australia	For vacant Victoria State heavyweight title
25	Loss	11–12–2	David Light	UD	6	29 Sep 2018	ABA Stadium, Auckland, New Zealand	
24	Loss	11–11–2	Junior Fa	UD	6	27 May 2017	ABA Stadium Auckland, New Zealand	
23	Loss	11–10–2	Demsey McKean	TKO	10 (10)	24 Mar 2017	Ipswich Civic Centre, Ipswich, Queensland, Australia	For Australian interim heavyweight title
22	Loss	11–9–2	Demsey McKean	UD	6	3 Dec 2016	Mansfield Tavern, Mansfield, Queensland, Australia	
21	Loss	11–8–2	Willie Nasio	RTD	4 (10), 3:00	7 Oct 2016	Jupiters Hotel & Casino, Broadbeach, Queensland, Australia	For Australian heavyweight title
20	Loss	11–7–2	Bowie Tupou	TKO	5 (6), 0:54	27 Feb 2016	Darwin’s Convention Centre, Darwin, Northern Territory, Australia	
19	Loss	11–6–2	Solomon Haumono	UD	10	30 Oct 2015	National Centre of Indigenous Excellence, Redfern, New South Wales, Australia	For PABA interim heavyweight title
18	Loss	11–5–2	Bowie Tupou	SD	10	27 Mar 2015	Club Punchbowl, Punchbowl, New South Wales, Australia	For vacant WBO Africa heavyweight title
17	Loss	11–4–2	Ben Edwards	UD	10	27 Feb 2015	Hellenic Club, Woden, Australian Capital Territory, Australia	For vacant Australian heavyweight title
16	Win	11–3–2	Tafa Misipati	UD	6	8 Oct 2014	The Melbourne Pavilion, Flemington, Victoria, Australia	
15	Loss	10–3–2	Kali Meehan	SD	3	4 Jun 2014	The Trusts Arena, Auckland, New Zealand	Super 8 Heavyweight Tournament - Quarter-final
14	Win	10–2–2	Jared Treloar	UD	10	8 May 2014	Club Punchbowl, Punchbowl, New South Wales, Australia	
13	Win	9–2–2	David Levi	UD	10	13 Dec 2013	Olympic Park Sports Centre, Homebush, New South Wales, Australia	Won vacant Australian heavyweight title
12	Win	8–2–2	Clarence Tillman	UD	10	16 Nov 2013	Gladstone Entertainment Convention Centre, Gladstone, Queensland, Australia	Won vacant WBF (Foundation) Asia Pacific heavyweight title
11	Win	7–2–2	Scott Belshaw	KO	1 (6), 1:46	29 Aug 2013	Eatons Hill Hotel, Eatons Hill, Queensland, Australia	
10	Loss	6–2–2	Joel Shackleton	MD	8	2 Aug 2013	Grand Star Receptions, Altona North, Victoria, Australia	For vacant Victoria State heavyweight title
9	Win	6–1–2	Paul Samways	KO	2 (4), 0:35	4 Jul 2013	Suncorp Stadium, Brisbane, Queensland, Australia	
8	Draw	5–1–2	Blayne Davis	TD	3 (6), 1:33	4 April 2013	Southport RSL Club, Southport, Queensland, Australia	
7	Win	5–1–1	Henry Taani	UD	6	17 Mar 2012	Gladstone Entertainment Convention Centre, Gladstone, Queensland, Australia	
6	Loss	4–1–1	David Aloua	UD	6	10 Oct 2011	Entertainment Centre, Newcastle, New South Wales, Australia	
5	Win	4–0–1	Stephen Gillingham	UD	4	19 Mar 2010	Knox Netball Centre, Ferntree Gully, Victoria, Australia	
4	Draw	3–0–1	Toivo Pettinen	SD	4	20 Mar 2009	Irish Club, Brisbane, Queensland, Australia	
3	Win	3–0	Dez Auld	KO	1 (3), 1:08	28 Feb 2009	Colossus Reception Lounge, West End, Queensland, Australia	
2	Win	2–0	Marlon Toby	TKO	2 (4), 1:21	14 Nov 2008	Gold Coast Convention Centre, Broadbeach, Queensland, Australia	
1	Win	1–0	John Boyd	UD	4	17 Oct 2008	Irish Club, Brisbane, Queensland, Australia	

Sporting positions
Regional boxing titles
Vacant Title last held by Solomon Haumono	Australian heavyweight champion 17 February 2012 – September 2012; Vacated	Vacant Title next held by Willie Nasio
