= Willie Nasio =

New Zealand boxer

- Born: Viliami Mavaetangi Okalani Nasio; 24 April 1986 (age 40); Rewa, New Zealand
- Nationality: New Zealander; Australian
- Height: 188 cm (6 ft 2 in)
- Weight: 262 lb (119 kg; 18 st 10 lb)
- Division: Heavyweight
- Reach: 187 cm (73.6 in)
- Style: Boxing
- Stance: Orthodox
- Years active: 2013–present

Professional boxing record
- Total: 16
- Wins: 12
- By knockout: 11
- Losses: 4
- By knockout: 2
- Draws: 0
- No contests: 0

Other information
- Occupation: Boxer
- Boxing record from BoxRec
- Last updated on: 7 October 2017

Viliami Mavaetangi Okalani Nasio (born 24 April 1986, in Rewa) is an Australian professional boxer. Nasio is of Tongan Descent.

Nasio is ranked in multiple major regional rankings, including 9th in WBO Asia Pacific and 2nd in WBC – OPBF.

Nasio's biggest bout in his career was against Japanese boxer Kyotaro Fujimoto for the vacant WBC – OPBF Heavyweight Title and the first time fighting out of Australia as a professional. Nasio lost the bout by unanimous decision.

== Personal life ==
Nasio's parents are both from Tonga and migrated to New Zealand to find a better life for their children. Nasio was born and raised in New Zealand with five younger brothers. Nasio attended Wesley College and James Cook High and also enjoyed a year of high school in America. At 19 he served a two-year volunteer mission for the LDS church and that included serving the community and teaching Christian principles. Nasio is married and lives on the Gold Coast. He has three boys. He currently works as a support worker in a mental health facility.

== Professional boxing titles ==
- Australian New South Wales State
  - Australia – New South Wales State heavyweight title (262½Ibs)
- Australian National Boxing Federation
  - Australian National heavyweight title (257¾Ibs)
- Australian Queensland State
  - Australia - Queensland State heavyweight title (241½Ibs)

== Professional boxing record ==
| 16 fights | 12 wins | 4 losses |
|---|---|---|
| By knockout | 11 | 2 |
| By decision | 1 | 2 |

| No. | Result | Record | Opponent | Type | Round, time | Date | Location | Notes |
|---|---|---|---|---|---|---|---|---|
| 16 | Lose | 12–4 | (Australia) Herman Ene Purcell | MD | 8 | 13 July 2019 | Rumours International, Toowoomba, Queensland, Australia | vacant Australian National Boxing Federation Australasian Heavy Title |
| 15 | Win | 12–3 | (Australia) Herman Ene Purcell | TKO | 4 (8) | 3 November 2018 | Rumours International, Toowoomba, Queensland, Australia | vacant Queensland State Heavyweight Title |
| 14 | Win | 11–3 | (Australia) Ben Sosoli | TKO | 2 (6) | 9 December 2017 | The Melbourne Pavilion, Flemington, Victoria, Australia | |
| 13 | Lose | 10–3 | (Australia) Demsey McKean | TKO | 6 (10); 0:51 | 6 October 2017 | The Melbourne Pavilion, Flemington, Victoria, Australia | Australia national heavyweight title |
| 12 | Lose | 10–2 | (Japan) Kyotaro Fujimoto | UD | 12 | 14 January 2017 | Korakuen Hall, Tokyo, Japan | vacant WBC – OPBF heavyweight title |
| 11 | Win | 10–1 | (Australia) Hunter Sam | RTD | 4 (10); 3:00 | 7 October 2016 | Jupiters Hotel & Casino, Broadbeach, Queensland, Australia | Australian heavyweight title |
| 10 | Win | 9–1 | (Australia) Joel Clifton | KO | 4 (10); 2:30 | 27 February 2016 | Darwin’s Convention Centre, Darwin, Northern Territory, Australia | vacant Australian heavyweight title |
| 9 | Win | 8–1 | (United States) Clarence Tillman | TKO | 3 (6); 1:39 | 20 November 2015 | Club Punchbowl, Punchbowl, New South Wales, Australia | |
| 8 | Win | 7–1 | (Australia) Moses Havea | TKO | 3 (8); 1:58 | 4 July 2015 | Club Punchbowl, Punchbowl, New South Wales, Australia | vacant Australia – New South Wales State heavyweight title |
| 7 | Win | 6–1 | (Australia) Nathan McKay | KO | 1 (6); 2:46 | 27 March 2015 | Club Punchbowl, Punchbowl, New South Wales, Australia | |
| 6 | Win | 5–1 | (New Zealand) Tafa Misipati | UD | 5 | 20 December 2014 | Jupiters Hotel & Casino, Broadbeach, Queensland, Australia | |
| 5 | Win | 4–1 | (New Zealand) Dean Garmonsway | TKO | 3 (6); 1:05 | 13 June 2014 | Jupiters Hotel & Casino, Broadbeach, Queensland, Australia | |
| 4 | Lose | 3–1 | (Australia) Tai Tuivasa | TKO | 1 (3); 2:00 | 3 April 2014 | The Melbourne Pavilion, Flemington, Victoria, Australia | Last Man Standing Tournament – Semi final |
| 3 | Win | 3–0 | (Samoa) Royce Sio | TKO | 1 (3); 0:37 | 3 April 2014 | The Melbourne Pavilion, Flemington, Victoria, Australia | Last Man Standing Tournament – Quarter final |
| 2 | Win | 2–0 | (Australia) Moses Havea | KO | 3 (4); 1:01 | 19 March 2014 | Jupiters Hotel & Casino, Broadbeach, Queensland, Australia | |
| 1 | Win | 1–0 | (Australia) Eddy Marsters | KO | 1 (4); 1:43 | 4 April 2013 | Southport RSL Club, Southport, Queensland, Australia | |
