= Herman Ene-Purcell =

Samoan boxer

- Born: Herman Ene-Purcell; 19 December 1994 (age 31); Samoa
- Other names: The Herminator
- Nationality: Samoan; New Zealander; Australian
- Weight: 116.9 kg (258 lb; 18 st 6 lb)
- Division: Heavyweight
- Style: Boxing
- Team: TGW and Smithy's Promotions
- Years active: 2013–present

Professional boxing record
- Total: 26
- Wins: 17
- By knockout: 9
- Losses: 9
- By knockout: 5
- Draws: 0

Other information
- Occupation: Professional boxer
- Boxing record from BoxRec

Herman Ene-Purcell (born 19 December 1994, Samoa) also known as "The Herminator" is an Australian professional boxer.

The biggest win of Ene-Purcell's career was against Justin Whitehead in October 2016, where Ene-Purcell won the bout by UD. Five months later, Ene-Purcell took on boxing veteran Afa Tatupu. Tatupu is well known for his New Zealand title bout against Joseph Parker with Parker receiving a serious cut. Ene-Purcell won the bout against Tatupu by first round TKO. The biggest bout of Ene-Purcell's career so far was against Kyotaro Fujimoto in Japan in May 2017. This bout was for both the WBC – OPBF and vacant WBO Asia Pacific Heavyweight Titles. Ene-Purcell lost the bout by TKO in the 9th round where his corner threw in the towel.

== Professional boxing record ==
24 fights	16 wins	8 losses
By knockout	8	4
By decision	8	4
Draws	0	

No.	Result	Record	Opponent	Type	Round, time	Date	Location	Notes
24	Win	16–8	(Samoa) (New Zealand) Viliamu Motusaga	UD	4	4 October 2019	SkyCity, Auckland, New Zealand	
23	Win	15–8	(Australia) (New Zealand) Willie Nasio	MD	8	13 July 2019	(Australia) Rumours International, Toowoomba, Queensland	vacant Australian National Boxing Federation Australasian Heavy Title
22	Win	14–8	(Australia) Nick Midgley	TKO	1 (4) 1:31	9 March 2019	(Australia) Rumours International, Toowoomba, Queensland	
21	Lose	13–8	(Australia) (New Zealand) Willie Nasio	TKO	4 (8) 2:50	3 November 2018	(Australia) Rumours International, Toowoomba, Queensland	vacant Australia - Queensland State Heavyweight Title
20	Win	13–7	(Australia) John Szigeti	KO	2 (6) 2:59	14 October 2017	Convention & Exhibition Centre, Brisbane, Australia	
19	Lose	13–7	(Australia) Randall Rayment	UD	6	22 July 2017	Rumours International, Toowoomba, Queensland, Australia	
18	Lose	12–6	(Japan) Kyotaro Fujimoto	TKO	9 (12)	8 May 2017	Korakuen Hall, Tokyo, Japan	WBC – OPBF & vacant WBO Asia Pacific Heavyweight Titles
17	Win	12–5	(Samoa) Afa Tatupu	TKO	1 (5) 2:18	11 March 2017	Rumours International, Toowoomba, Queensland, Australia	
16	Win	11–5	(Australia) Justin Whitehead	UD	6	22 October 2016	Rumours International, Toowoomba, Queensland, Australia	
15	Win	10–5	(South Korea) Jong Suk Lee	TKO	1 (6)	24 June 2016	Capital Gym, Beijing, China	
14	Win	9–5	(Australia) Moses Havea	UD	4	13 May 2016	Rumours International, Toowoomba, Queensland, Australia	
13	Draw	8–5	(New Zealand) Thomas Heads	MD	5	16 April 2016	The Trusts Arena, Auckland, New Zealand	World Title Under card
12	Lose	7–5	(Australia) Paul Gallen	TKO	4 (5) 2:00	29 January 2016	Rumours International, Toowoomba, Queensland, Australia	
11	Win	7–4	(United States) Clarence Tillman	UD	4	31 October 2015	Rumours International, Toowoomba, Queensland, Australia	
10	Win	6–4	(Thailand) Isaraphap Sor Varunee	MD	6	11 September 2015	Yu Hang Gymnasium, Hangzhou, China	
9	Lose	5–4	(Australia) Joel Clifton	UD	8	27 June 2015	Rumours International, Toowoomba, Queensland, Australia	vacant Australia – Queensland State heavyweight title
8	Win	5–3	(Australia) James Rowe	KO	1 (4) 1:50	14 March 2015	Rumours International, Toowoomba, Queensland, Australia	
7	Win	4–3	(Australia) Rhys Sullivan	KO	1 (4) 0:36	29 November 2014	Grand Hotel Yamanto, Ipswich, Queensland, Australia	
6	Win	3–3	(Australia) Clinton Banks	KO	1 (3) 1:42	31 October 2014	Rumours International, Toowoomba, Queensland, Australia	
5	Lose	2–3	(Australia) Kyle Brumby	SD	3	26 July 2014	Queensland State Equestrian Centre, Caboolture, Queensland, Australia	
4	Win	2–2	(Australia) James Frost	UD	4	4 July 2014	Rumours International, Toowoomba, Queensland, Australia	
3	Lose	1–2	(Australia) Paul Gallen	TKO	2 (4) 2:53	19 February 2014	Hordern Pavilion, Moore Park, New South Wales, Australia	
2	Win	1–1	(Australia) Mathew Steel	TKO	1 (3) 1:19	24 November 2013	Smithy's Gym, Toowoomba, Queensland, Australia	
1	Lose	0–1	(Australia) Olaf Olsen	UD	3	4 October 2013	Rumours International, Toowoomba, Queensland, Australia	

== Personal life ==
Ene-Purcell was born in Samoa but was raised in North Shore, Auckland, New Zealand. He attended Glenfield College during his high school years.
