= Louis Monaco =

American boxer

Personal information
- Nickname: The Facelifter
- Nationality: American
- Born: Louis Monaco; April 28, 1968 (age 58) Denver, Colorado, U.S.
- Height: 5 ft 11 in (180 cm)
- Weight: Heavyweight

Boxing career
- Reach: 80 in (203 cm)
- Stance: Orthodox

Boxing record
- Total fights: 60
- Wins: 16
- Win by KO: 8
- Losses: 39
- Draws: 5
- No contests: 0

Louis "the Facelifter" Monaco (born April 28, 1968) is an American professional boxer in the heavyweight division and the former CAM (Canadian American Mexican) heavyweight champion. Nicknamed "the Facelifter," Monaco is a clubfighter who fought several significant fighters of his era including world champions Buster Douglas, Trevor Berbick, Vitali Klitschko, Lamon Brewster, Peter McNeeley, Michael Dokes, and Eric Esch.

== Early life ==
Monaco turned pro in 1995 at the age of twenty-seven, after a professional bodybuilding career.

== Pro career ==
In Monaco’s second bout, his opponent Eric "Butterbean" Esch quickly connected with a devastating right hand that knocked Monaco out. The referee immediately called a halt to the bout as Monaco lay motionless at the edge of the ring. He would go on to fight Trevor Berbick, Kirk Johnson, Vitali Klitschko, Lamon Brewster, Fres Oquendo, Lance Whitaker, and Maurice Harris. But he also had some notable successes, particularly earlier in his career, when he drew with former kickboxer Rick Roufus, knocked out Peter McNeeley and beat Michael Dokes. Another big win came by knockout over a then-undefeated Kevin McBride.

=== Buster Douglas ===
On May 13, 1997, Monaco faced Buster Douglas as part of the former world champion's comeback after six years of inactivity. The fight was carried on national television as part of a USA Tuesday Night Fights program, and was Monaco's first fight since he defeated Dokes. Although Monaco had hurt Douglas and left him on unsteady legs in the first round, Douglas managed to survive to finish the round. As the referee stepped in to separate the two fighters, Monaco caught Douglas flush with a right hook that dropped him to the canvas. Douglas required assistance to rise to his feet, and since the punch came after the bell it was considered a foul and Douglas was given five minutes to recover. He was not able to continue and Monaco was disqualified as a result.

== Professional boxing record ==
16 Wins (8 knockouts, 8 decisions), 39 Losses (15 knockouts, 24 decisions), 5 Draws
Result	Record	Opponent	Type	Round	Date	Location	Notes
Loss	16–39–5	(United States) John Wesley Nofire	TKO	1	06/04/2014	(United States) The Ritz, Raleigh, North Carolina, U.S.	
Loss	16–38–5	(United States) Alonzo Butler	KO	1	14/12/2013	(United States) Mustang Fitness, Oak Ridge, North Carolina, U.S.	
Loss	16–37–5	(United States) Kenny Lemos	UD	4	31/08/2012	(United States) Red and Jerrys, Sheridan, Colorado, U.S.	
Loss	16–36–5	(United States) Eric Boose	TKO	5	09/02/2008	(United States) Rochester, Washington, U.S.	Northwest Boxing Association heavyweight title. Referee stopped the bout at 0:22 of the fifth round due to Monaco's left eye being swollen shut.
Draw	16–35–5	(United States) Donnell Wiggins	MD	10	19/01/2008	(United States) Tacoma, Washington, U.S.	
Win	16–35–4	(United States) Justin Wrede	KO	1	16/03/2007	(United States) Denver, Colorado, U.S.	Wrede knocked out at 0:37 of the first round.
Loss	15–35–4	(United States) Raphael Butler	DQ	6	12/01/2007	(United States) Minneapolis, Minnesota, U.S.	Monaco disqualified at 1:56 of round 6 due to an illegal groin strike.
Loss	15–34–4	(United States) Joey Abell	TKO	4	13/10/2006	(United States) Philadelphia, Pennsylvania, U.S.	Referee stopped the bout at 0:30 of the fourth round after Abell unleashed a flurry of hooks on Monaco.
Win	15–33–4	(United States) Kenny Lemos	UD	6	22/09/2006	(United States) Commerce City, Colorado, U.S.	
Loss	14–33–4	(Trinidad and Tobago) Kertson Manswell	TKO	8	15/06/2006	Fyzabad, Trinidad and Tobago	Referee stopped the bout at 2:36 of the eighth round.
Loss	14–32–4	(United States) Terry Smith	UD	8	27/04/2006	(United States) Tulsa, Oklahoma, U.S.	
Loss	14–31–4	(United States) Lance Whitaker	TKO	3	26/08/2005	(United States) Hollywood, Florida, U.S.	Referee stopped the bout at 0:30 of the third round.
Loss	14–30–4	(United States) China Smith	UD	10	29/07/2005	(United States) Sarasota, Florida, U.S.	
Win	14–29–4	(United States) Ross Brantley	TKO	2	15/04/2005	(United States) Denver, Colorado, U.S.	Referee stopped the bout at 2:34 of the second round.
Loss	13–29–4	(United States) Eddie Chambers	UD	10	03/12/2004	(United States) Philadelphia, Pennsylvania, U.S.	
Loss	13–28–4	(United States) Malik Scott	UD	8	04/11/2004	(United States) San Antonio, Texas, U.S.	
Win	13–27–4	(Canada) Shane Sutcliffe	UD	10	24/04/2004	(United States) Billings, Montana, U.S.	Won Canadian American Mexican heavyweight title.
Draw	12–27–4	(United States) Kenny Lemos	MD	6	28/02/2004	(United States) Thornton, Colorado, U.S.	
Loss	12–27–3	(United States) Kenny Lemos	UD	4	14/09/2003	(United States) Johnstown, Colorado, U.S.	
Loss	12–26–3	(United States) Jeremy Williams	KO	1	17/03/2002	(United States) Oroville, California, U.S.	Monaco knocked out at 0:29 of the first round.
Loss	12–25–3	(United States) Malik Scott	SD	6	13/10/2001	(United States) Atlantic City, New Jersey, U.S.	
Win	12–24–3	(United States) Ritchie Goosehead	TKO	2	25/08/2001	(United States) New Town, North Dakota, U.S.	Referee stopped the bout at 2:00 of the second round.
Loss	11–24–3	(United States) Robert Wiggins	UD	6	26/07/2001	(United States) New York City, New York, U.S.	
Loss	11–23–3	(United States) Zuri Lawrence	UD	6	04/05/2001	(United States) Uncasville, Connecticut, U.S.	
Loss	11–22–3	(Nigeria) David Defiagbon	UD	8	04/10/2000	(United States) Canyonville, Oregon, U.S.	
Loss	11–21–3	(Tonga) Israel Armenta	KO	8	05/05/2000	(United States) Paradise, Nevada, U.S.	Monaco knocked out at 1:27 of the eighth round.
Win	11–20–3	(United States) Rocky Bentley	UD	4	14/12/1999	(United States) Indianapolis, Indiana, U.S.	
Win	10–20–3	(United States) Jason Jackson	KO	1	02/12/1999	(United States) Saint Charles, Missouri, U.S.	Jackson knocked out at 2:17 of the first round.
Win	9–20–3	(United States) Chris Thomas	UD	4	16/10/1999	(United States) Merrillville, Indiana, U.S.	
Win	8–20–3	(United States) Rocky Bentley	UD	4	29/09/1999	(United States) Chicago, Illinois, U.S.	
Loss	7–20–3	(United States) Maurice Harris	TKO	1	May 22, 1999	(United States) Paradise, Nevada, U.S.	Referee stopped the bout at 1:33 of the first round.
Loss	7–19–3	(United States) Charles Shufford	UD	6	06/05/1999	(United States) Tacoma, Washington, U.S.	
Loss	7–18–3	(United States) Ross Puritty	PTS	8	22/04/1999	(United States) Tulsa, Oklahoma, U.S.	
Draw	7–17–3	(United States) Edward Wright	PTS	8	01/04/1999	(United States) Worley, Idaho, U.S.	
Loss	7–17–2	(Cuba) Elieser Castillo	UD	8	30/01/1999	(United States) Atlantic City, New Jersey, U.S.	
Loss	7–16–2	(United States) Fres Oquendo	PTS	6	11/12/1998	(United States) Pueblo, Colorado, U.S.	
Loss	7–15–2	(United States) Derrick Banks	PTS	6	07/11/1998	(United States) Bismarck, North Dakota, U.S.	
Loss	7–14–2	(United States) Lamon Brewster	KO	2	14/06/1998	(United States) Atlantic City, New Jersey, U.S.	
Loss	7–13–2	(United States) Monte Barrett	UD	6	09/05/1998	(United States) Atlantic City, New Jersey, U.S.	
Loss	7–12–2	(Ukraine) Vitali Klitschko	KO	3	07/03/1998	Cologne, Germany	
Loss	7–11–2	(United States) Anthony Green	PTS	8	27/02/1998	(United States) Studio City, California, U.S.	
Loss	7–10–2	(United States) Lawrence Clay Bey	UD	10	18/11/1997	(United States) Upper Marlboro, Maryland, U.S.	
Loss	7–9–2	(Canada) Kirk Johnson	TKO	7	12/07/1997	(United States) Biloxi, Mississippi, U.S.	Referee stopped the bout at 2:58 of the seventh round.
Loss	7–8–2	(United States) Gary Bell	UD	10	01/07/1997	(United States) Wildwood, New Jersey, U.S.	
Win	7–7–2	(United States) Jessie Henry	KO	8	24/05/1997	(United States) Denver, Colorado, U.S.	
Loss	6–7–2	(United States) James "Buster" Douglas	DQ	1	13/05/1997	(United States) Biloxi, Mississippi, U.S.	Monaco knocked out Douglas with a punch after the bell had rung for the first round. Douglas could not recover and was awarded the fight by disqualification.
Win	6–6–2	(United States) Michael Dokes	PTS	10	05/04/1997	(United States) Denver, Colorado, U.S.	
Win	5–6–2	(Republic of Ireland) Kevin McBride	TKO	5	07/02/1997	(United States) Las Vegas, Nevada, U.S.	Referee stopped the bout at 1:44 of the fifth round.
Loss	4–6–2	(United States) Jeremy Williams	KO	3	19/12/1996	(United States) Reseda, California, U.S.	Monaco knocked out at 1:35 of the third round.
Loss	4–5-2	(United States) Michael Grant	TKO	3	06/10/1996	(United States) Los Angeles, California, U.S.	
Loss	4–4–2	(Canada) Trevor Berbick	UD	10	18/09/1996	(United States) Westbury, New York, U.S.	
Win	4–3–2	(United States) Peter McNeeley	TKO	5	13/07/1996	(United States) Denver, Colorado, U.S.	Referee stopped the fight at 2:57 of the fifth round.
Loss	3–3–2	(United States) Cody Koch	UD	4	04/06/1996	(United States) Las Vegas, Nevada, U.S.	
Win	3–2–2	(United States) Mark Connolly	PTS	4	27/04/1996	(United States) Paradise, Nevada, U.S.	
Win	2–2–2	(United States) Rudy Gutierrez	TKO	4	06/04/1996	(United States) Boise, Idaho, U.S.	
Draw	1–2–2	(United States) Tyrone Castell	PTS	4	28/03/1996	(United States) Denver, Colorado, U.S.	
Loss	1–2–1	(United States) Mark Connolly	UD	4	15/03/1996	(United States) Paradise, Nevada, U.S.	
Draw	1–1–1	(United States) Rick Roufus	PTS	4	26/01/1996	(United States) Paradise, Nevada, U.S.	
Loss	1–1	(United States) Eric Esch	KO	1	01/12/1995	(United States) Indio, California, U.S.	Monaco was knocked out at 1:50 of the first round.
Win	1–0	(United States) Terry Lopez	SD	4	18/08/1995	(United States) Denver, Colorado, U.S.	
