= Marcelo Nascimento =

Brazilian boxer (born 1980)

Personal information
- Nickname: Centuriao
- Born: Marcelo Luis Do Nascimento; 20 October 1980 (age 46) Suzano, São Paulo, Brazil
- Height: 6 ft 5 in (196 cm)
- Weight: Heavyweight

Boxing career
- Stance: Orthodox

Boxing record
- Total fights: 41
- Wins: 18
- Win by KO: 16
- Losses: 23
Medal record
Men's amateur boxing
Brazilian National Championships
Bronze medal – third place	2006 Sao Paulo	Super-heavyweight

Marcelo Luis Do Nascimento (born 20 October 1980) is a Brazilian former professional boxer who competed from 2007 to 2023. At regional level, he challenged once for the PABA heavyweight title in 2012, and the PABA interim heavyweight title in 2014.

== Amateur career ==
Nascimento competed in the 2005 and 2006 Brazilian National Championships, losing on points in the quarterfinal and semifinal.

== Professional career ==
Nascimento faced undefeated heavyweight Tyson Fury on 19 February 2011 at Wembley Arena in London. Nascimento was knocked down in the first round and lost the fight via knockout in the fifth round.

On 26 April 2014, Nascimento was a late replacement for Joseph Parker on the undercard of Wladimir Klitschko's world heavyweight title defence against Australian Alex Leapai. He was stopped after a flurry of blows in the seventh round, although Nascimento protested the decision.

Nascimento faced Dillian Whyte on 7 February 2015 at the Camden Centre. Nascimento was knocked down once in the 1st round, and twice in the 2nd, losing the fight via knockout.

He fought Simon Kean for the vacant IBO Intercontinental heavyweight title at the Olympia Theatre in Montreal, Canada, on 17 June 2017, losing by knockout in the fifth round.

Nascimento faced Demsey McKean on 16 March 2019 at the Southport Sharks AFL Club in Queensland. The referee stopped the fight in the second round after Nascimento was knocked down three times.

== Professional boxing record ==
41 fights	18 wins	23 losses
By knockout	16	16
By decision	2	7

No.	Result	Record	Opponent	Type	Round, time	Date	Location	Notes
41	Loss	18–23	Seun Salami	TKO	3 (6), 2:35	16 Sep 2023	Hotel InterContinental, Vienna, Austria	
40	Loss	18–22	Dmytro Bezus	TKO	2 (8), 2:58	12 Feb 2022	Studio 69, Riga, Latvia	
39	Loss	18–21	Marcin Siwy	KO	1 (8), 2:58	21 Nov 2021	Dwor Artusa, Toruń, Poland	
38	Loss	18–20	Jose Larduet	TKO	1 (6), 2:48	9 Nov 2019	Kuppel, Hamburg, Germany	
37	Loss	18–19	Demsey McKean	TKO	2 (8), 1:28	16 Mar 2019	Southport Australian Football Club, Gold Coast, Australia	
36	Loss	18–18	Vladyslav Sirenko	KO	3 (8), 1:16	15 Dec 2018	Parkovy Convention Centre, Kyiv, Ukraine	
35	Loss	18–17	Evgenyi Romanov	KO	6 (8), 2:08	14 Jul 2018	RCC Boxing Academy, Yekaterinburg, Russia	
34	Loss	18–16	Bogdan Dinu	TKO	3 (8), 2:50	8 Dec 2017	Sports Hall, Buzău, Romania	
33	Loss	18–15	Simon Kean	TKO	5 (10), 0:59	17 Jun 2017	Olympia Theatre, Montreal, Canada	For vacant IBO Inter-Continental heavyweight title
32	Win	18–14	Sergiej Werwejko	TKO	5 (8), 0:57	17 March 2017	Aqua Żyrardów, Żyrardów, Poland	
31	Loss	17–14	Andriy Rudenko	KO	3 (10), 2:50	24 Jul 2016	National University Odesa Law Academy, Odesa, Ukraine	For inaugural Ukraine International heavyweight title
30	Loss	17–13	Mariusz Wach	UD	10	14 May 2016	Hala Azoty, Kędzierzyn-Koźle, Poland	
29	Loss	17–12	Johann Duhaupas	UD	10	5 Feb 2016	Gymnase du Lycée Technique de Monaco, Monte Carlo, Monaco	
28	Loss	17–11	Derek Chisora	PTS	10	26 Sep 2015	The SSE Arena, London, England	
27	Loss	17–10	Sergey Kuzmin	UD	8	22 Jun 2015	Boxing & Gym Academy, Moscow, Russia	
26	Loss	17–9	Carlos Takam	KO	4 (10)	10 Apr 2015	Gymnase du Clos de l'Arche, Noisy-le-Grand, France	
25	Loss	17–8	Dillian Whyte	KO	2 (8), 0:41	7 Feb 2015	Camden Centre, London, England	
24	Loss	17–7	Eddie Chambers	PTS	8	8 Nov 2014	Bluewater, Stone, England	
23	Loss	17–6	Joseph Parker	TKO	7 (10), 2:21	26 Apr 2014	König Pilsener Arena, Oberhausen, Germany	For vacant WBA-PABA interim heavyweight title
22	Win	17–5	Francisco Gomes Paraiso Lopes	TKO	2 (6), 1:17	25 Jan 2014	Arena Projeto Viver, São Paulo, Brazil	
21	Loss	16–5	Solomon Haumono	TKO	3 (8), 0:53	17 Oct 2013	Melbourne Pavilion, Melbourne, Australia	
20	Loss	16–4	Tor Hamer	UD	3	20 Jun 2012	York Hall, London, England	Prizefighter 25: heavyweight quarter-final
19	Loss	16–3	Jovo Pudar	UD	12	30 Mar 2012	Hotel Jugoslavija, Belgrade, Serbia	For WBA-PABA heavyweight title
18	Win	16–2	Saennes Pereira	KO	2 (8), 1:00	13 Mar 2012	Ginasio Baby Barione, São Paulo, Brazil	
17	Loss	15–2	Mahmoud Charr	RTD	8 (12), 3:00	18 Nov 2011	Kugelbake-Halle, Cuxhaven, Germany	For vacant WBC International Silver heavyweight title
16	Win	15–1	Basilio Montanha	KO	1 (6), 2:49	18 Oct 2011	Ginasio Baby Barione, São Paulo, Brazil	
15	Win	14–1	Marcelo Furia	KO	5 (8), 2:14	14 Jun 2011	Nacional Atletico Clube, São Paulo, Brazil	
14	Loss	13–1	Tyson Fury	KO	5 (10), 2:48	19 Feb 2011	Wembley Arena, London, England	
13	Win	13–0	Gonzalo Basile	TKO	1 (12), 0:34	23 Oct 2010	Escuela Técnica Nº 1, Buenos Aires, Argentina	Won WBO Latino heavyweight title
12	Win	12–0	Nestor Fabian Insaurralde	RTD	1 (8), 2:15	7 Sep 2010	Ginasio Baby Barione, São Paulo, Brazil	
11	Win	11–0	Claudemir Dias	RTD	1 (10), 1:51	17 Jul 2010	São Paulo, Brazil	
10	Win	10–0	Sandro De Jesus	KO	2 (4), 2:22	30 Apr 2010	Prefeitura Municipal, São Paulo, Brazil	
9	Win	9–0	Jesus Gorces	RTD	5 (6), 0:01	9 Feb 2010	Ginasio Baby Barione, São Paulo, Brazil	
8	Win	8–0	Rodrigo Zenedim	KO	2 (8)	26 Jan 2010	Ginasio Baby Barione, São Paulo, Brazil	
7	Win	7–0	Marcelo De Jesus Cortez	TKO	1 (8), 1:31	15 Dec 2009	Ginasio Baby Barione, São Paulo, Brazil	
6	Win	6–0	Renilson Dos Santos	TKO	1 (8), 1:09	24 Oct 2009	Casablanca, São Paulo, Brazil	
5	Win	5–0	Adilson Da Silva Santos	UD	6	19 Sept 2009	Ginasio Municipal, São Paulo, Brazil	
4	Win	4–0	Adilson Nolli	KO	1 (6), 1:48	1 Sep 2009	Ginasio Baby Barione, São Paulo, Brazil	
3	Win	3–0	Augusto Custodio de Melo	KO	1 (4), 1:00	7 Jul 2009	Ginasio Baby Barione, São Paulo, Brazil	
2	Win	2–0	Carlos Alberto De Oliveira Junior	TKO	1 (4), 0:37	26 Jun 2009	Mococa, São Paulo, Brazil	
1	Win	1–0	Raphael Zumbano Love	UD	4	3 Aug 2007	Ginasio Municipal Blota Junior, São Paulo, Brazil	

== Kickboxing record ==
Kickboxing record
0 Wins (0 KO's), 1 Loss, 0 Draw
Date	Result	Opponent	Event	Location	Method	Round	Time
2008-08-16	Loss	(Japan) Tsuyoshi Yokoyama	DEEP: Gladiators	Okayama, Japan	Decision (unanimous)	3	3:00
Legend: Win Loss Draw/No contest Notes

Sporting positions
Regional boxing titles
Preceded by Gonzalo Basile	WBO Latino heavyweight champion 23 October 2010 – March 2011; Vacated	Vacant Title next held by Raphael Zumbano Love
