= Malik Scott =

American boxer (born 1980)

Personal information
- Nicknames: King; The Noble Artist; 80-72
- Born: Dohonna Malik Scott; October 16, 1980 (age 45) Philadelphia, Pennsylvania, U.S.
- Height: 6 ft 4 in (193 cm)
- Weight: Heavyweight

Boxing career
- Reach: 81 in (206 cm)
- Stance: Orthodox

Boxing record
- Total fights: 42
- Wins: 38
- Win by KO: 13
- Losses: 3
- Draws: 1
Medal record
Men's amateur boxing
US Olympic Trials
Gold medal – first place	2000 Tampa	Heavyweight
U.S. Challenge
Bronze medal – third place	1999 Colorado Springs	Heavyweight
U.S. National Championships
Gold medal – first place	1999 Colorado Springs	Heavyweight
American Boxing Classic
Gold medal – first place	1998 Milwaukee	Heavyweight
U.S. Junior National Championships
Gold medal – first place	1998 Colorado Springs	Heavyweight
Golden Gloves
Bronze medal – third place	1998 Biloxi	Heavyweight

Dohonna Malik Scott (born October 16, 1980) is an American boxing trainer and former professional boxer who competed from 2000 to 2016. As an amateur, he won the U.S. National Championships in 1999.

== Amateur career ==
Scott started boxing at the age of 11 and had a stellar amateur career. In 1997, he won the Junior Olympics Championships and the "Under-19" Junior World Championships. Scott also won the American Boxing Classic title in 1998.

He won the National AAU Heavyweight Championship in 1999 defeating world champ Michael Bennett and Jason Estrada in the process. In 2000 he beat DaVarryl Williamson and Malcolm Tann but lost to Estrada at the trials and then Bennett in the Olympic box-offs and therefore did not qualify. His record was 76–3.

== Professional career ==
=== Early career ===
Scott turned professional in 2000 and has only three defeats to his name. His wins include former amateur star Terry McGroom and journeymen David Bostice and Louis Monaco, he took a big step up in early 2007 and defeated former contender Charles Shufford.

=== Return to the ring ===
He did not fight between December 2008 and the beginning of 2012, due to a bicep injury. He recovered from the injury and made a comeback in early 2012. Scott was under the tuition of boxing Hall of Fame trainer Jesse Reid until 2014 when the pair split because Scott believed Father Time was catching up with Reid, Scott then reunited with his former amateur coach, Fred Jenkins. Scott was promoted by Goossen-Tutor. Scott was scheduled to fight on the Paul Williams vs. Nobuhiro Ishida undercard at the American Bank Center, Corpus Christi, Texas. The fight took place on February 18, 2012. The opponent was heavyweight journeyman Kendrick Releford. It marked Scott's first return to the boxing ring, more than three years after his last fight. It was the second time Scott faced Releford in his career, as they fought back in January 2006. As the case for their first fight, Scott won by unanimous decision.

Scott's second fight in 2012 was on June 23, 2012 at Sportsmen's Lodge, Studio City, California. He faced off against the Mexican heavyweight boxer, Alvaro Morales. Scott won by a unanimous decision. He won by 60–54 on all three scorecards. Scott then fought on the undercard of Andre Ward vs. Chad Dawson on September 8, 2012 at the Oracle Arena, Oakland, California. It was against Tongan heavyweight contender Bowie Tupou. Scott won the fight by an 8-round TKO.

=== Career from 2013–2016 ===
==== Scott vs. Glazkov ====
On January 10, 2013 it was announced that Scott would face off against unbeaten heavyweight contender Vyacheslav Glazkov. The fight took place on February 23, 2013 and ended in a draw, the first blemish on Scott's record.

==== Scott vs. Chisora ====
On July 20, 2013 Scott fought Derek Chisora for the vacant WBO International Heavyweight title. The fight took place at the Wembley Arena in London, England and Scott suffered his first defeat, a sixth round knockout. Having been floored, he waited until the referee counted to nine to get up, but was adjudged to have been counted out in the act of rising.

==== Scott vs. Wilder ====
On January 24, 2014 Scott beat Grover Young by a stoppage in the second round, before getting knocked out in the first round by Deontay Wilder on March 15, 2014. There was speculation that Scott had taken a dive against Wilder, but Scott denied this.

==== Scott vs. Leapai ====
In his next fight, Scott fought Alex Leapai. Scott secured the win via unanimous decision, winning 100–90, 99–91 and 98–92 on the scorecards.

==== Scott vs. Thompson ====
Scott then fought crafty southpaw veteran and somewhat of a gatekeeper, Tony Thompson, on October 30, 2015. The fight was scheduled for ten rounds and Scott went on to win the fight via unanimous decision despite being knocked down in the ninth round.

==== Scott vs. Ortiz ====
On November 12, 2016 he fought Cuban boxer Luis Ortiz in Monaco. Despite claiming to have a perfect camp, the bout was largely uneventful and disappointing. Scott was on the backfoot for most of the fight and seemed completely unwilling to engage with Ortiz. British commentator Adam Smith lamented the bout as "the worst I have seen in many years". Matchroom promoter Eddie Hearn was also visibly disappointed after the bout and claimed that "Scott didn't do us any favors tonight". The official scorecards were 120–105, 120–106, and 119–106 all in favor of Ortiz.

== Life after boxing ==
Scott became the new head coach for Deontay Wilder in 2021. Their first fight working together was Wilder's eleventh-round knockout loss in his trilogy fight against undefeated WBC and The Ring champion Tyson Fury, the latter of whom Scott had previously sparred with, when Scott had his eardrum busted by Fury.

Scott became the new head coach for Gerald Washington in 2023. Their first fight working together was Washington's ten-round decision loss in his fight against former two-time world heavyweight title challenger Derek Chisora, the latter of whom Scott had previously fought with, when Scott lost his undefeated professional record against Chisora.

Scott became the new assistant coach for Gilberto Ramírez in 2024.

== Personal life ==
In December 2023, it was revealed that Scott was in a relationship with British sports broadcaster Kate Abdo, whom he had previously been pictured training with in September 2023. In March 2024, the pair went public with their relationship on Instagram. They married in September 2024.

== Professional boxing record ==
42 fights	38 wins	3 losses
By knockout	13	2
By decision	25	1
Draws	1	

No.	Result	Record	Opponent	Type	Round, time	Date	Location	Notes
42	Loss	38–3–1	Luis Ortiz	UD	12	Nov 12, 2016	Salle des Etoiles, Monte Carlo, Monaco	For vacant WBA Inter-Continental heavyweight title
41	Win	38–2–1	Tony Thompson	UD	10	Oct 30, 2015	The Venue at UCF, Orlando, Florida, U.S.	
40	Win	37–2–1	Alex Leapai	UD	10	Oct 31, 2014	Logan Metro Sports Centre, Logan City, Australia	
39	Loss	36–2–1	Deontay Wilder	KO	1 (12), 1:36	Mar 15, 2014	Coliseo Rubén Rodríguez, Bayamón, Puerto Rico	
38	Win	36–1–1	Grover Young	TKO	2 (6), 1:51	Jan 24, 2014	Little Creek Casino Resort, Shelton, Washington, U.S.	
37	Loss	35–1–1	Derek Chisora	TKO	6 (10), 2:56	Jul 20, 2013	Wembley Arena, London, England	For vacant WBO International heavyweight title
36	Draw	35–0–1	Vyacheslav Glazkov	SD	10	Feb 23, 2013	The Paramount, Huntington, New York, U.S.	
35	Win	35–0	Bowie Tupou	TKO	8 (8), 0:52	Sep 8, 2012	Oracle Arena, Oakland, California, U.S.	
34	Win	34–0	Alvaro Morales	UD	6	Jun 23, 2012	Sportsmen's Lodge, Studio City, California, U.S.	
33	Win	33–0	Kendrick Releford	UD	8	Feb 18, 2012	American Bank Center, Corpus Christi, Texas, U.S.	
32	Win	32–0	Raphael Butler	UD	8	Dec 13, 2008	Morongo Casino Resort & Spa, Cabazon, California, U.S.	
31	Win	31–0	Arthur Cook	TKO	7 (8), 2:46	Jul 18, 2008	Star of the Desert Arena, Primm, Nevada, U.S.	
30	Win	30–0	Damian Norris	UD	10	Dec 11, 2007	Crazy Horse Saloon, Miami, Florida, U.S.	
29	Win	29–0	Sedreck Fields	UD	4	Jul 20, 2007	Mahi Temple Shrine Auditorium, Miami, Florida, U.S.	
28	Win	28–0	Charles Shufford	UD	10	May 4, 2007	Pearl Concert Theater, Paradise, Nevada, U.S.	
27	Win	27–0	Ramon Hayes	UD	8	Feb 22, 2007	Tachi Palace Hotel & Casino, Lemoore, California, U.S.	
26	Win	26–0	Andrew Greeley	UD	8	Dec 14, 2006	Tachi Palace Hotel & Casino, Lemoore, California, U.S.	
25	Win	25–0	Marcus McGee	UD	8	Jul 22, 2006	Boardwalk Hall, Atlantic City, New Jersey, U.S.	
24	Win	24–0	Kendrick Releford	UD	8	Jan 28, 2006	Boardwalk Hall, Atlantic City, New Jersey, U.S.	
23	Win	23–0	Dennis McKinney	UD	6	Nov 19, 2005	Cricket Arena, Charlotte, North Carolina, U.S.	
22	Win	22–0	Shane Swartz	UD	8	Apr 23, 2005	Caesars Palace, Paradise, Nevada, U.S.	
21	Win	21–0	David Bostice	UD	8	Jan 29, 2005	Boardwalk Hall, Atlantic City, New Jersey, U.S.	
20	Win	20–0	Louis Monaco	UD	8	Nov 4, 2004	AT&T Center, San Antonio, Texas, U.S.	
19	Win	19–0	Drexie James	KO	1 (6), 2:25	Aug 6, 2004	National Guard Armory, Philadelphia, Pennsylvania, U.S.	
18	Win	18–0	Carlton Johnson	UD	8	Jul 26, 2003	Grand Olympic Auditorium, Los Angeles, California, U.S.	
17	Win	17–0	Otis Tisdale	UD	8	Jun 7, 2003	Boardwalk Hall, Atlantic City, New Jersey, U.S.	
16	Win	16–0	Onebo Maxime	UD	6	Apr 4, 2003	Fernwood Resort, Bushkill, Pennsylvania, U.S.	
15	Win	15–0	Terry McGroom	TKO	2 (8), 2:58	Feb 1, 2003	Mohegan Sun Arena, Montville, Connecticut, U.S.	
14	Win	14–0	Ken Murphy	UD	8	Oct 19, 2002	Reliant Center, Houston, Texas, U.S.	
13	Win	13–0	Bryan Blakely	TKO	1 (8), 2:46	Aug 24, 2002	Bally's, Atlantic City, New Jersey, U.S.	
12	Win	12–0	Lyle McDowell	RTD	7 (8), 3:00	Jul 13, 2002	Sam's Town Gambling Hall, Kansas City, Missouri, U.S.	
11	Win	11–0	Dan Ward	UD	8	Jun 8, 2002	The Pyramid, Memphis, Tennessee, U.S.	
10	Win	10–0	Britton Thomas	KO	1 (8), 2:01	Apr 27, 2002	Mohegan Sun Arena, Montville, Connecticut, U.S.	
9	Win	9–0	Curtis Taylor	TKO	3 (8)	Mar 16, 2002	Fernwood Hotel & Resort, Bushkill, Pennsylvania, U.S.	
8	Win	8–0	Ramon Hayes	UD	6	Feb 2, 2002	Bally's, Atlantic City, New Jersey, U.S.	
7	Win	7–0	Louis Monaco	SD	6	Oct 13, 2001	Tropicana Casino & Resort, Atlantic City, New Jersey, U.S.	
6	Win	6–0	Ron Brown	TKO	2 (6), 2:20	Aug 18, 2001	Mohegan Sun Arena, Montville, Connecticut, U.S.	
5	Win	5–0	Tracy Williams	UD	4	Jun 15, 2001	The Blue Horizon, Philadelphia, Pennsylvania, U.S.	
4	Win	4–0	Robert Anderson	TKO	2 (4), 2:23	May 19, 2001	Mohegan Sun Arena, Montville, Connecticut, U.S.	
3	Win	3–0	Maurice Wheeler	UD	4	Mar 16, 2001	The Blue Horizon, Philadelphia, Pennsylvania, U.S.	
2	Win	2–0	Jackie Beard	TKO	3 (4)	Feb 2, 2001	Celeste Center, Columbus, Ohio, U.S.	
1	Win	1–0	Tony Foster	TKO	2 (4), 2:32	Nov 10, 2000	Mandalay Bay Events Center, Paradise, Nevada, U.S.	

== Exhibition boxing record ==
1 fight	0 wins	1 loss
By decision	0	1

No.	Result	Record	Opponent	Type	Round, time	Date	Location	Notes
1	Loss	0–1	Sergei Kharitonov	SD	6	18 Mar, 2022	M1 Casino, Minsk, Belarus	

Sporting positions
Preceded by DaVarryl Williamson	United States Amateur Heavyweight Champion; 1999	Succeeded by Michael Bennett
