= Paul Gallen =

Australia international rugby league footballer

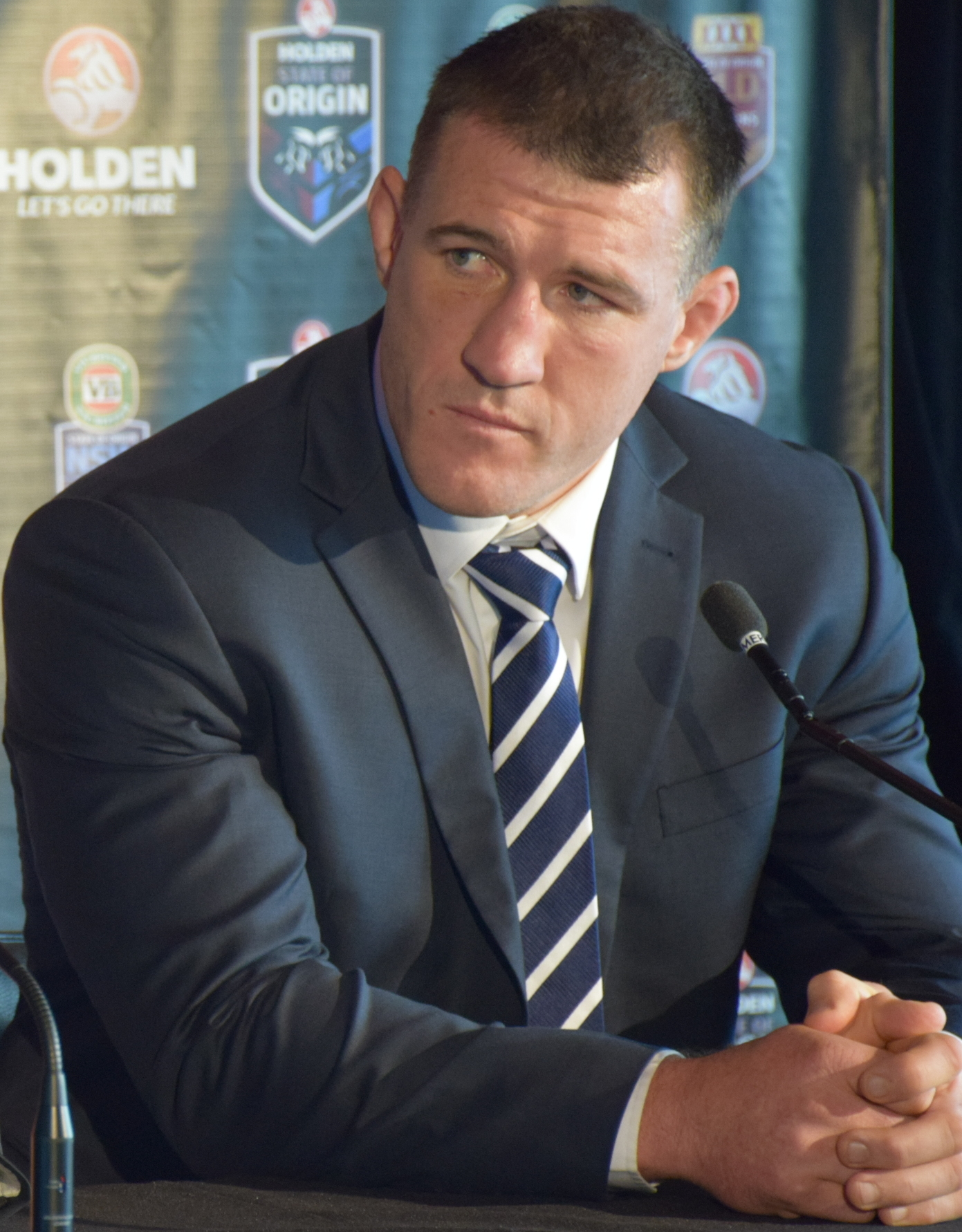

Personal information
- Full name: Paul Mark Gallen
- Born: 14 August 1981 (age 45) Sydney, New South Wales, Australia
- Height: 180 cm (5 ft 11 in)
- Weight: 102 kg (16 st 1 lb)

Playing information
- Position: Lock, Second-row, Prop
Club
Years	Team	Pld	T	G	FG	P
2001–19	Cronulla Sharks	348	63	2	1	257
Representative
Years	Team	Pld	T	G	FG	P
2006	NSW City	2	0	1	0	2
2006–16	New South Wales	24	1	1	0	6
2006–07	Prime Minister's XIII	2	0	0	0	0
2008–16	Australia	32	3	0	0	12
2011–12	NRL All Stars	2	0	0	0	0
- Source: As of 31 May 2021
- Boxing career
- Height: 180 cm (5 ft 11 in)
- Weight: Heavyweight
- Reach: 180 cm (71 in)
- Stance: Orthodox

Boxing record
- Total fights: 18
- Wins: 15
- Win by KO: 8
- Losses: 2
- Draws: 1

Paul Gallen (born 14 August 1981) is an Australian former professional rugby league footballer and retired professional boxer. He played as a lock, second-row and prop forward and captained the Cronulla-Sutherland Sharks in the NRL to their maiden NRL Premiership in 2016.

He is a former captain and representative of the New South Wales State of Origin team. He has also been the vice captain of Australia and played his whole NRL career with the Sharks, with whom he won the 2016 NRL Premiership. He was the NRL's oldest player playing in 2018. He shares the Australian first grade record for most seasons played in the NRL with Cameron Smith at 19 seasons.

== Background ==
Gallen played his junior rugby league for the Wentworthville Magpies and was in the Parramatta Eels junior system playing the S. G. Ball Cup before being overlooked by the Eels. Gallen later signed with the Cronulla-Sutherland Sharks. Speaking about being let go by Parramatta, Gallen said "I was never really given a go, I wasn't really getting a look-in there and decided to go elsewhere. I wanted to move away from the area and I knew one of the Cronulla trainers at the time, I played SG Ball for them, that's it. I'm from the district but I wouldn't call myself an ex-Parramatta player, that's for sure".

== Playing career ==
=== 2001–2003 ===
In June 2001, Gallen made his NRL debut for the Cronulla-Sutherland Sharks against the Parramatta Eels in round 15 at Toyota Park. Cronulla lost the match 36 to 6. He made one more appearance that season in the final round, where the Sharks were victorious over the Brisbane Broncos 24–16.

Gallen scored his first ever try at first-grade level during round 14 of the 2002 season - against the Canberra Raiders. Gallen made 21 appearances in his second season at first-grade level for the Cronulla-Sutherland Sharks, scoring one try during the season.

During the round 11 match (in 2003) against the Newcastle Knights, Gallen was sent off by referee Paul Simpkins after a high shot on Sean Rudder. Gallen made a total of 17 first-grade appearances for the club in 2003, scoring five tries in the process.

=== 2004 ===
In the opening round of the year, against the Wests Tigers, Gallen was involved in a fight which saw him suspended for two weeks after the NRL Judiciary found him guilty of a contrary conduct charge. The judiciary decided that he had "instigated and tried to go on with a fight involving Wests Tigers prop John Skandalis". He also sustained an elbow injury during the match which ruled him out until round six of the competition. Gallen was the only player in round one to contest his charge.

In round 11 against the Manly-Warringah Sea Eagles, Gallen scored an impressive two tries in his sides 30 points to 28 victory.

In June it was announced that Gallen had extended his contract for another three seasons.

In the 2004 season, Gallen made a total of 19 appearances for the club and scoring five tries.

=== 2005 ===
In round 24, Cronulla-Sutherland scored their biggest ever victory, scoring a 68 points to 6 win over the Manly-Warringah Sea Eagles, with Gallen scoring a try.

Cronulla finished in seventh place and therefore qualified to be involved in the finals series. They were drawn against the second placed side, which happened to be local rivals the St. George Illawarra Dragons. In the match, Gallen managed to score a try for Cronulla, however it was not enough to save the Sharks from losing the match 28 points to 22.

Gallen was presented the Cronulla-Sutherland Sharks chairman's Award in 2005 by the club's President Barry Pierce after his impressive season where he led the NRL in both hit ups and off loads. At the 2005 Dally M Awards, he was also nominated for the position of "Best Lock". However, he lost out to Manly lock Ben Kennedy.

In the 2005 NRL season, Gallen played a total of 25 games in first-grade for Cronulla-Sutherland and in the process scored six tries.

Gallen ran 3,920 metres with the ball in 2005, more than any other player in the competition.

=== 2006 ===
Before the season started it was discovered that Gallen was suffering from a bulging disc in his lower back. After having surgery he wanted to return to action just a week after having the surgery done. He ended up making his comeback within nine weeks which amazed Cronulla's medical staff as it was predicted it would take much longer than that.

Gallen won his first ever representative jersey when he was selected to play for City in the annual City vs Country match. In June, Cronulla coach Stuart Raper pleaded with the New South Wales selectors to give Gallen an opportunity to prove his worth at State of Origin level. Raper stated that "Gallen's been consistent for us over the past 18 months and if NSW hiccup on Wednesday night...he'll certainly be knocking on the door." After missing out on selection in the first game, Gallen was again not selected for the second match. However, after New South Wales was thrashed by Queensland, the NSW selectors made drastic changes to their team. Gallen was selected to play in the third and last match, which was to be the State of Origin decider, where Queensland came from behind to win 16–14.

Gallen was selected to play in the annual Prime Minister's XIII squad to play Papua New Guinea at the end of September. The Prime Minister's XIII defeated Papua New Guinea 28 points to 8 at Port Moresby but Gallen failed to be selected for the Australian Tri Nations squad. At the end of the season, Paul Gallen won the Sharks' supporters player of the year award

In September 2006, just days after he was voted Cronulla supporters player of the year, Gallen announced that he was considering leaving Cronulla despite having a year left on his contract. Gallen stated that it wasn't the club or coaching staff that made him consider leaving the club but rather the fact that "I just want to play semi-final football". Gallen also stated that he was "looking for a fresh start and a fresh challenge".

In 2006, Gallen made 18 appearances in first-grade for the Cronulla-Sutherland Sharks, scoring seven tries for the club.

=== 2007 ===
Due to his claims at the end of the previous season that he wanted out of the club, there was much speculation about Gallen's future at the Cronulla-Sutherland Sharks before the season started as his contract was set to expire at the back end of the 2007 season. There were rumours that he would walk out on the club after his contract expired as well as other reports in the media that Manly would sign him as a long-term replacement for a recently retired player, Ben Kennedy. However, Gallen decided to stay at the club, putting to rest the rumours in the media, by signing a four-year deal with Cronulla, meaning that he would stay at the club until 2011. Gallen reportedly turned down a $1.4 million offer from Manly in favor of a $1.1 million deal. Manly confirmed that they were interested in signing him, however Manly denied that they ever made an actual offer for him. Gallen stated that he decided to stay at the Sharks because he was inspired by Nathan Hindmarsh, who had recently signed a contract with the Eels in the aim to be a one-club man. Gallen also cited the fact that he wanted to win a premiership with the club because "you'd be remembered for your whole life here in Cronulla if you were part of that first-ever premiership" as well as the fact that his "old man also wanted me to stay at the Sharks."

In a pre-season trial against South Sydney, Gallen had to be taken from the field with an injury to his ankle. After undergoing an MRI scan on his ankle, Cronulla physio Matt Green stated that "the scans have revealed ligament damage but the injury is not as bad as first feared." The injury kept Gallen out until round four of the season when he made his return against the St. George-Illawarra Dragons and he made his first start of the NRL season a week later against the Wests Tigers but only because he was taking painkilling injections before the games. In round 6, against Canberra, Gallen set up a try for Ben Pomeroy before he was forced from the field due to injury during the second half. However, the injury wasn't serious and he was cleared to play in the following round against Newcastle.

It was announced that Gallen had been selected for City to play in the annual City vs Country match but he was later forced to withdraw due to another ankle injury which he sustained in round 7 against Newcastle. The injury was not serious enough to keep him out for the next NRL fixture against the New Zealand Warriors, but the club doctors believed that his right ankle could not handle playing in the City vs Country match as that would have meant playing three games in the space of six days.

In the match against the Brisbane Broncos in round 9, Gallen put in another impressive performance, setting up a try in the process. A week later in the match against Canterbury, Gallen sealed the 30–20 points victory with a try in the dying stages of the match. For his effort against Canterbury-Bankstown, Gallen was voted as the man of the match. The following week in round 11, Gallen again scored a try in a losing effort against the Sydney Roosters.

On 11 June, in round 13, Gallen sparked controversy in the local derby match against St. George Illawarra at Oki Jubilee Stadium in which Cronulla triumphed 20 points to 16. Gallen was accused of taking a dive after copping a high shot by Richie Williams. After the referee awarded the penalty Gallen rose to his feet and winked at his teammates. Gallen defended the incident claiming that he "was hit in the head and it hurt". St. George-Illawarra coach Nathan Brown hit out at Paul Gallen claiming that he "is a tough player, that wouldn't have knocked the top off him." Also in the match, Gallen was placed on report for a head high tackle on Ben Creagh. However, Gallen did manage to set up the first Sharks try for Mitch Brown.

In the days following the game, Gallen continued to come under scrutiny. Gallen explained "We've got a motto here at the Sharks: do whatever it takes to win. That's what I've always done. I'm never going to stop doing that." Gallen continued "we won the game. That's all I care about."

In round 14 against New Zealand, Gallen was again put on report by the referee after a head high tackle on Patrick Ah Van. The judiciary charged him with a grade one careless high tackle which in turn meant that he was suspended for the game against South Sydney in the following round. Cronulla had the bye in round 16 which meant that Gallen had not had the previous two weeks to prove himself for selection in the third game of the series in State of Origin. Despite this, Gallen was rewarded for his impressive season to date with a call-up to the New South Wales side for the third State of Origin match, although New South Wales were already 2–0 down in the three-game series.

Before the third game of the Origin series, Gallen declared that he "can't wait to be running out and getting booed, I love that sort of stuff. It would mean everything going up there and beating them." After New South Wales had lost the first two games, there was talk that New South Wales lacked passion and Gallen stated that "everybody was sick of hearing it." Just over ten minutes into the match, Gallen put a high shot on Tonie Carroll. Gallen, who was also helped out by his teammates, then got into a fight with the opposition. Speaking of the incident after the match, Gallen stated that he and Greg Bird "came here saying that if anyone touches any of us, we're putting it on. I knew it would be a penalty but I knew it would also fire the boys up – it's good for the game."

Gallen was impressive in just his second State of Origin match. In the 55 minutes of the match that he was involved in, he made a total of 127 metres gained as well as making 15 tackles. But even after Queensland lost their lock in the first minute, both their wingers during the middle of the game and numerous other injuries to players who could not come off due to no more replacements, NSW could not get more than a two-point lead until the 72nd minute where they scored two tries, Gallen setting up the final New South Wales try for Hazem El Masri, which in the process capped off an 18 points to 4 New South Wales victory.

After the round 18 loss to the Sydney Roosters, Gallen was charged by the NRL judiciary for a "grade one contrary conduct offence" after he head-butted Roosters' player Shane Shackleton, and was subsequently banned for one match.

Round 22, against third-placed Parramatta Eels, saw the Cronulla club snap a seven-match losing streak in golden point extra time. It was later reported that after the match that Gallen was involved in an incident with Reece Williams at winger Dustin Cooper's house. After consuming what was said to be "too much alcohol", teammates and good friends Gallen and Williams were involved in a fight. Coach Ricky Stuart stated that although it should not have happened, that there was nothing serious about it as it was only "a scuffle".

At the conclusion of the NRL Premiership, Gallen was rewarded for his fine season with a call-up for the Australian squad in a one-off test match against New Zealand on 14 October. However, it was announced barely a week before the match that Gallen had to be pulled out of the squad due to a "shoulder injury", with his replacement being Melbourne Storm's Dallas Johnson.

=== 2008 ===
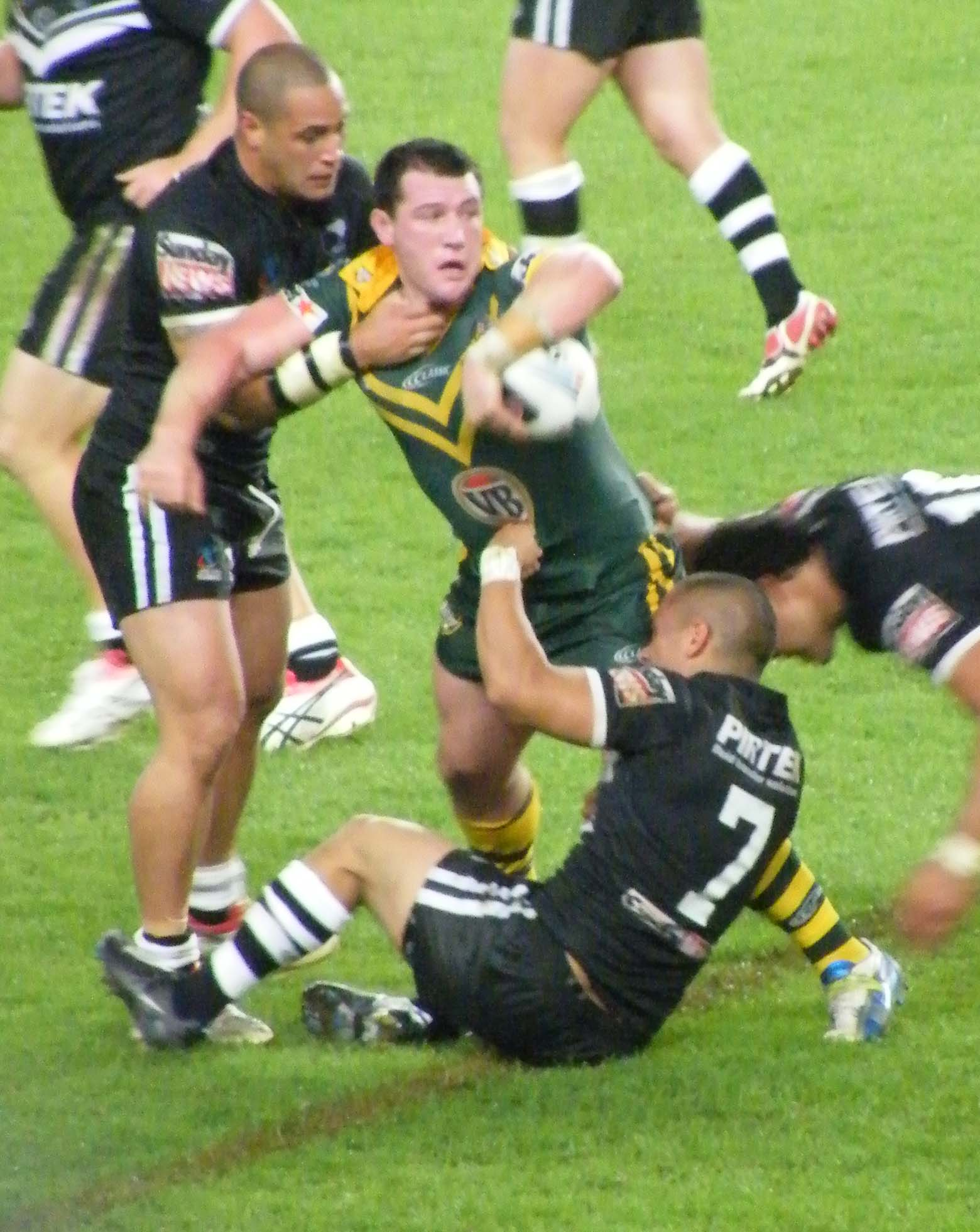
Gallen playing for Australia against New Zealand at the 2008 Rugby League World Cup

Gallen attracted attention after the round 3 clash with the Titans for "grubby" play. The Sydney Morning Herald even claimed Gallen should face jail time for his facial assault on Anthony Laffranchi, where he allegedly attempted to rip the stitches out of Laffranchi's head wound. Titans player Josh Graham also claimed that Gallen clutched his testicles in a tackle on Graham. Photos of the incident supported the allegation, but no charge was laid against Gallen.

Gallen was selected for all three games in the annual State of Origin series. In the third and decisive game of the series Gallen gave away three penalties and came under heavy criticism from fans for his lack of discipline, in particular for his late hit on Johnathan Thurston. Gallen described the loss as the worst of his career but defended himself saying "they've been saying that those three penalties cost us the game. But there's no way in the world that anyone can say that." Due to his ill discipline in the deciding match, there were calls for Gallen to be sacked as captain of the Sharks but coach Ricky Stuart came out and backed Gallen by saying that he should remain the club captain.

In round 18, Gallen scored Cronulla's only try in the top of the table clash in which the Sharks lost to Manly by 34 points to 6. Gallen described the heavy defeat as embarrassing. In the following match against the Newcastle Knights, Gallen was put on report for a high shot on Cooper Vuna. He also gave away several other penalties and claimed that the referees were targeting him.

In 2008, Gallen represented Australia in the centennial test, scoring a try.

In August, Gallen was named in Australia's preliminary 46-man Kangaroos squad for the 2008 Rugby League World Cup, and in October 2008 he was selected in the final 24-man Australia squad.

=== 2009 ===
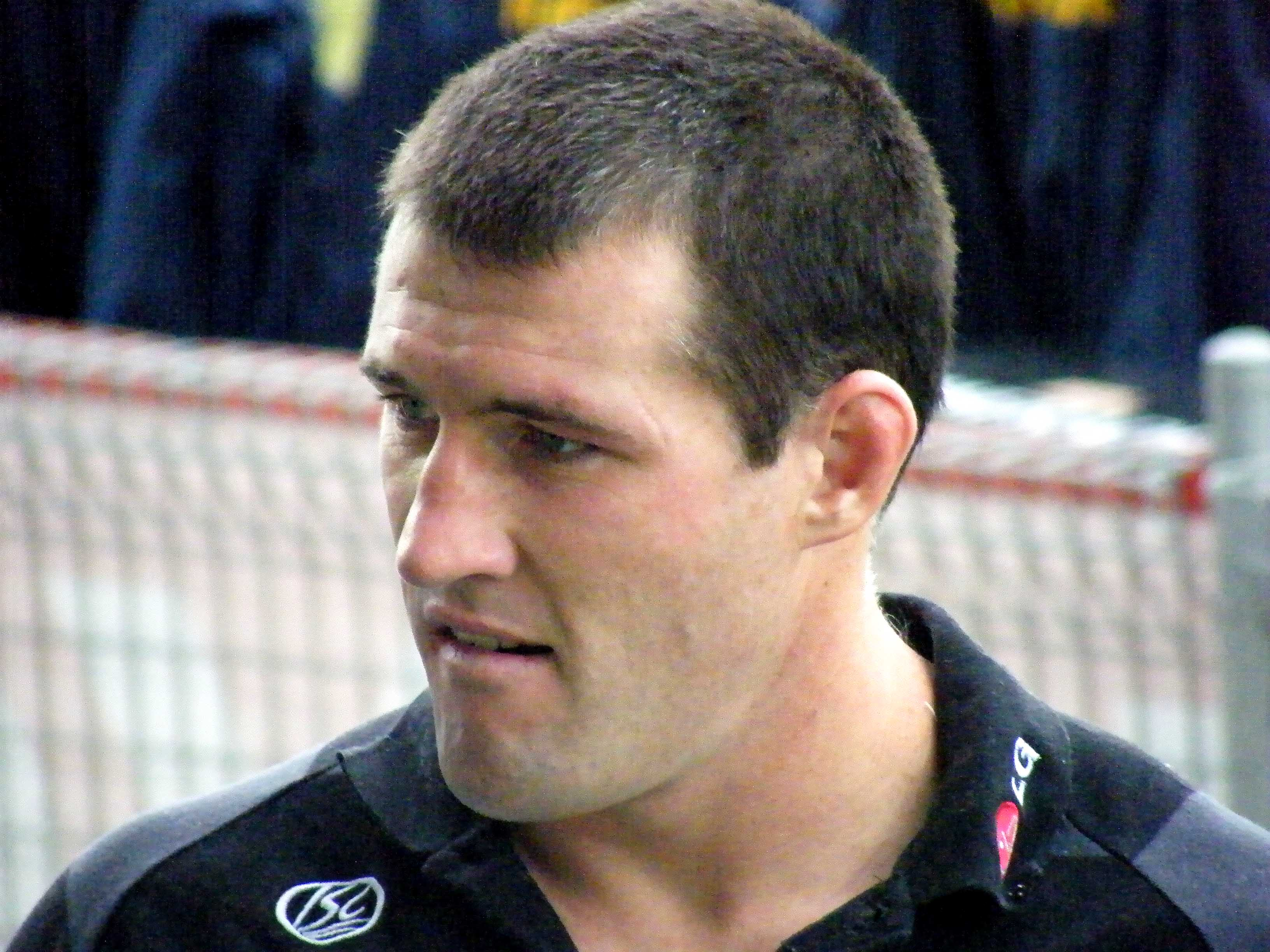
Gallen in 2009

Although the Cronulla-Sutherland Sharks sat on the bottom of the 2009 NRL ladder after six rounds, Gallen was named in the preliminary 40-man squad for NSW for the 2009 State of Origin series. He was selected for Australia in the one-off test match against New Zealand on 8 May 2009.

In May 2009, Gallen attracted public outrage for racially abusing Mickey Paea. The incident gained attention initially, due to the angry reaction of Paea, who is normally a quiet reserved player with strong religious beliefs. After the event, there were reports Gallen would be stripped of his captaincy. However, pre-empting this, on 1 June 2009, Gallen voluntarily stepped down from his Cronulla captaincy.

In December 2009, Gallen was issued with an infringement notice for urinating in public near the head of a drunken friend.

=== 2010 ===
For the 2010 ANZAC Test, Gallen was selected to play for Australia at lock forward in their victory against New Zealand. Gallen was left out of the first match of the State of Origin side but was selected for the two remaining matches. In the second game he was placed on report for a high shot on Nate Myles in the twenty-third minute. However, his performance was still impressive enough to lead Daily Telegraph Sports editor-at-large, New South Welshman Phil Rothfield, to postulate, that of all the NSW players, Gallen "possibly" would be the only one that Queensland would select if he was theoretically available for them (in place of Ashley Harrison). In the last match of the series, Gallen scored his side's first try just before half time and set up teammate Kurt Gidley for their second try just after the interval.

=== 2011 ===
2011 later emerged as the year of Cronulla's supplements saga

Gallen was selected for all three games of the 2011 State of Origin series, as well as for Australia. He scored his first try of the season in round 3, against the Panthers. The Sharks won that game 44–12. In State of Origin II, Gallen was selected to play prop and became the first prop to play 80 minutes in an Origin match since Steve Price in 2007. His performance earned him man of the match. Subsequently, there were claims that his performance was fuelled by performance-enhancing substances, with journalist Andrew Webster linking these in an article; "State of Origin 2016: The tough question NSW Blues captain Paul Gallen does not want to answer".

On 3 November 2011, the annual RLIF Awards dinner was held at the Tower of London and Gallen was named lock forward of the year.

=== 2012 ===
Gallen again captained New South Wales for the 2012 State of Origin series, which was again won by Queensland. At the 2012 Dally M Awards, Gallen was named the NRL's lock forward of the year.

=== 2013 ===
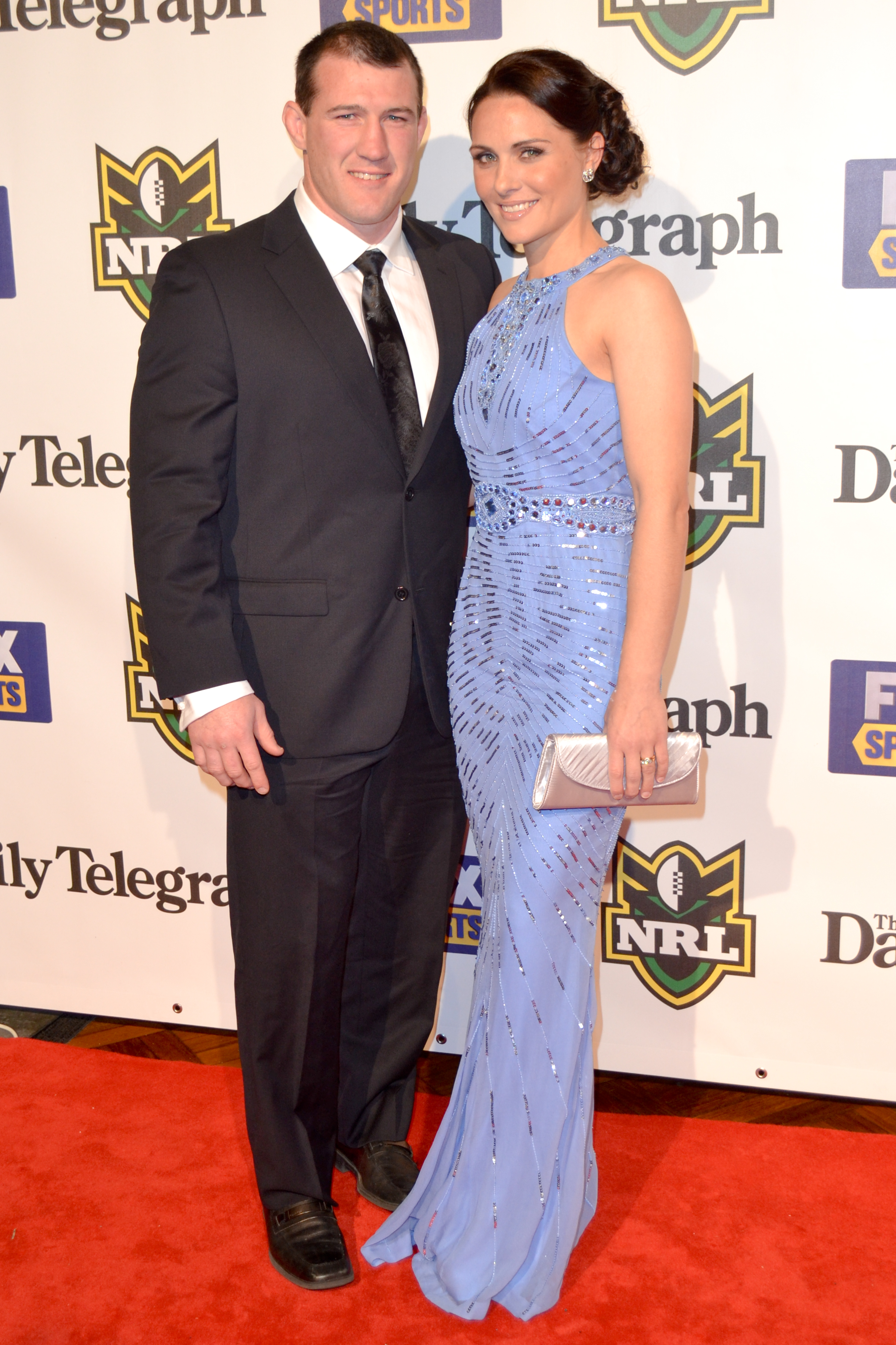
Gallen with partner Anne in 2012.

Gallen was selected for Australia in the 2013 ANZAC Test and played at lock forward. In what was the first test match ever played in Canberra, New Zealand were defeated. Gallen was named captain of the New South Wales Blues for the 2013 State of Origin series. Gallen led his team to victory in game one at ANZ Stadium in Sydney, however the win was not without controversy, and Gallen lodged a guilty plea to a striking charge for the undefended punches he landed on the head of Maroons forward, Nate Myles. Gallen had not been sent off for the infringement and this led to the introduction of a rule that players would be sin-binned for any punch thrown in future Origin matches.

=== 2014 ===
On 22 August 2014, Gallen was one of the Cronulla players who pleaded guilty to having unknowingly used banned peptides, and in exchange was given a reduced, backdated ban from ASADA and Sports Minister Peter Dutton for his part in the 2011 supplements scandal. Gallen received nearly $80,000 from the NRL to cover legal fees, however, in late October, Gallen sent an offensive tweet aimed at the NRL, complaining of a lack of support to him regarding the issue. It was later deleted and replaced with a story which Gallen attempted to blame his father, which Gallen admitted lying about before taking responsibility.

Prior to pleading guilty, Gallen stated that he and the other players will "be labelled drug cheats if they accept reduced bans".

On the event of the 2014 State of Origin series, Gallen labelled Queensland fans as "Two Heads". Speaking at the 2014 team announcement, Gallen said "If you take it as it comes, and you enjoy the part of it and enjoy going up there and listening to what those two heads give you, we have got the job done on the field before and that is where it counts". Gallen captained the New South Wales team to victory over Queensland in the 2014 State of Origin series. The win marked the first time that New South Wales had won the series during the current decade and it put an end to Queensland's record of eight series wins in a row.

=== 2015 ===
Gallen again captained NSW in the 2015 State of Origin series. Gallen missed the first game due to an injury, and after the third game decider attracted considerable criticism by the media for displaying a lack of leadership; "We saw nothing of that from Gallen, nor from any of them... just meek acceptance of their fate, while on the superbly led, magnificent Queensland side, even when 40 points up, they just wanted more, more, more!"

=== 2016 ===
Gallen was again the captain of NSW for the 2016 State of Origin series. After the second, and series losing, loss, highly respected rugby league pundit and former coach, Phil Gould, opined that NSW "have the wrong culture - and the wrong leaders". Despite this, Gallen retained the captaincy for the third game of the series, which was won by New South Wales 18–14. During the presentation ceremony after the match he was criticised by the Queensland media for allegedly walking away while the Queensland captain, Cameron Smith, was accepting the shield.

Gallen captained Cronulla-Sutherland to the 2016 NRL Grand Final. After a closely contested game, the team went on to win the Premiership, defeating the Melbourne Storm 14–12, the Sharks' first premiership in their 49-year history. Gallen himself played a key role, setting up Ben Barba for the first try of the night to put his side ahead 8–0.

=== 2017 ===
In 2017, Gallen was named in The City side in the last ever City v Country representative match. On 10 September 2017 Cronulla played against North Queensland in the elimination finals game. Cronulla were expected to win comfortably against a depleted NQ side but found themselves in a tight match at 14–14. With under a minute left, Gallen got within inches of the line for the match winning try but lost the ball. In extra time, Michael Morgan kicked a field goal for North Queensland to make it 15–14 which remained the final score and Cronulla were eliminated from the finals.

=== 2018 ===
In 2018, Gallen became a panelist on Channel Nine's all new 100% Footy Monday night show. After round 3, Gallen became the first player in NRL History to achieve 50,000 running metres. His closest rival is Billy Slater with 39,439 running metres. Gallen made 21 appearances for Cronulla in 2018 as the club reached the preliminary final before losing to Melbourne 22–6. Gallen did not feature in the match as he suffered an injury the previous week in Cronulla's victory over Penrith. In October, Gallen signed a one-year contract extension to stay at Cronulla for the 2019 season. The deal will make him the first man to play 19 consecutive seasons with an NRL club.

In November, Gallen spoke to the media in the aftermath of Valentine Holmes leaving the NRL in hopes of gaining an NFL contract. Gallen said “He's won a premiership with us, he's been our best player. But the way this has happened, I'm disappointed, Not only does he have a Sharks contract, he has an NRL contract. Now the NRL are always on about the integrity of the game, I don't see how this is good for the integrity of the game. A bloke breaking a contract with one year to go and just walking out on a club and the game. I think it's got to be a minimum two-years out of the game, if not out forever". Gallen's comments faced a negative reaction by former players such as Chris Walker and Mat Rogers. Rogers spoke to the media saying “I think Gal's overreacted,” Rogers told AAP. “For someone who goes and cops money for fighting while he's contracted, it's unbelievable that he'd come out and say something so stupid. Oh mate, Gal, keep your mouth shut mate".

Walker attacked Gallen on social media claiming Gallen was pushing negativity into the NRL. Gallen responded to Walker's tweet saying "Yesterday's news from yesterday's hero, clubs moved on Chris you should try. The game hasn't left the papers since GF cause of issues like this & coaches they say any publicity is good publicity maybe that's why you keep involving yourself in something that doesn't concern you. Jog on".

=== 2019 ===
On 10 March, Gallen rebuked Melbourne Player Cameron Smith and his calls for Melbourne's 2007 and 2009 premierships to be reinstated after Smith accused the NRL over double standards in relation to Cronulla's salary cap breaches. Smith was upset that Melbourne had been stripped of the 2007 and 2009 premierships yet Cronulla were allowed to keep their premiership.

Gallen responded by saying "We went in and self reported a $50,000 discrepancy, which the CEO thought was all it was. It turned out it was a $700,000 discrepancy. You maybe don't want the NRL going back and searching those books, particularly when they (Melbourne) were found to be $3.7 million over the salary cap over five years. Three of those years they were a million over the cap. Compared to the Sharks we were 750k over in intended third-party payments, the NRL found they were intended to be paid. Not all were paid".

Gallen then went on to say "If we got it taken off us, I would throw my ring away and I would quit the club immediately. It wouldn't sit well with me, The fact is we were under the salary cap in 2016, even with the intended third-party payments. We were under the salary cap. I have no issue with it".

2019 was also the year that Gallen took over from Scott Prince (166 Losses) as the player with the most losses in NRL history., subsequently surpassed by Ben Hunt.

In Round 9 against the Gold Coast Titans, Gallen scored his first try of the season and also kicked the first goal in his career on the full time siren as Cronulla won 26–18 at Suncorp Stadium. After kicking the goal, Gallen taunted the crowd with a hand gesture. In Round 11 against St George, Gallen kicked the second goal of his career as Cronulla won the match 22–9.

On August 21, 2019, Gallen was voted as one of the best players of the decade in the NRL team of the decade announcement which spanned from the 2010 to 2019 seasons. The panel who voted were made up of Premiership-winning coaches Phil Gould, Craig Bellamy, Trent Robinson and Ricky Stuart along with Hall of Famers Peter Sterling, Darren Lockyer, Danny Buderus and Laurie Daley.

Also in August 2019, it had been revealed that he had been offered to join the Newcastle Knights for twice as much as his current salary the previous year at $700,000. Gallen declined the contract offer, explaining that it would have a massive impact on him and his family and that he would want to stay loyal to Cronulla for the rest of his career.

In round 25 against the Wests Tigers, Gallen kicked a field goal as Cronulla-Sutherland won the match 25–8 at Leichhardt Oval. Both teams went into the game knowing that the winner would qualify for the finals.

Gallen's final game as a player came the following week in the elimination final as Cronulla were defeated by Manly-Warringah 28–16 at Brookvale Oval.

== Boxing career ==
Gallen began his amateur boxing career in 2012 in part of a rugby league versus rugby union charity event in Auckland, New Zealand. It was announced he would fight New Zealand international rugby union player Hikawera Elliot. Gallen received a three-round unanimous points victory over Elliot on debut. The following year Gallen prepared for his second amateur fight against another fellow New Zealand international player Liam Messam. He defeated Messam in a split decision over three two-minute rounds in Auckland.

In 2014, Gallen turned professional after it was confirmed he would fight Australian-based Herman Ene-Purcell on the undercard of Daniel Geale versus Garth Wood. Gallen was awarded a technical knockout victory inside two rounds despite being dropped by a left hand in the first-round.

Gallen was later scheduled to fight Anthony Watts, a former Cowboys, Sharks and Roosters utility National Rugby League player. Prior to the event, Gallen reported he had been admitted to hospital due to experiencing severe pain after contracting golden staph in his groin and underwent surgery privately in Sydney. Gallen extended his professional record with a second consecutive win after a first-round technical knockout victory.

His next opponent was for the Footy Show Fight Night in January 2015 against Randall Rayment, a current mixed martial arts fighter. Gallen won with a unanimous four-round points win. His fourth fight was another points decision victory over fellow-rugby league forward Bodene Thompson in a charity event at SkyCity Auckland.

On 20 December 2018, Gallen agreed to return to the ring to fight former professional rugby league footballer John Hopoate with the match being scheduled for 9 February 2019. Hopoate was knocked out in the second round of the bout. He said afterwards “I got caught by a good punch and I can’t hide from that, I went to sleep and fell over".

In the middle of 2019, it was announced that Gallen would return to the ring again with the opponent this time being former Australian rules footballer Barry Hall. In the lead up to the fight, Hall said of Gallen “I know it’s been painted as a code war, but even the support I’ve been getting off rugby league people has been overwhelming, He’s not a very liked human being … so I’ve got a lot of support". Gallen and Hall went the full six rounds, ending in a 57–57 draw. After the bout was over, each fighter thought he would win the decision.

Two more victories over Mark Hunt and Lucas Browne had Gallen challenging Justis Huni for the Australian heavyweight title on 16 June 2021. In the ten round bout, Gallen would be defeated when the referee stopped the bout in the final round. It was Gallen's first loss in his career.

Gallen fought Sonny Bill Williams in Sydney on July 16, 2025, winning the fight via split decision.

On 7 November 2026, Gallen was defeated in a first round knockout after a series of brutal uppercuts by Nelson Asofa-Solomona, after the match Gallen announced his retirement from boxing.

== NRL statistics ==
Year	Team	Games	Tries	Goals	FGs	Pts
2001	Cronulla-Sutherland Sharks	2				
2002	Cronulla-Sutherland Sharks	21	1			4
2003	Cronulla-Sutherland Sharks	17	5			20
2004	Cronulla-Sutherland Sharks	19	5			20
2005	Cronulla-Sutherland Sharks	25	6			24
2006	Cronulla-Sutherland Sharks	18	7			28
2007	Cronulla-Sutherland Sharks	19	2			8
2008	Cronulla-Sutherland Sharks	20	4			16
2009	Cronulla-Sutherland Sharks	16	7			28
2010	Cronulla-Sutherland Sharks	23	3			12
2011	Cronulla-Sutherland Sharks	20	6			24
2012	Cronulla-Sutherland Sharks	16	3			12
2013	Cronulla-Sutherland Sharks	16	2			8
2014	Cronulla-Sutherland Sharks	9	2			8
2015	Cronulla-Sutherland Sharks	18	1			4
2016	Cronulla-Sutherland Sharks	20	4			16
2017	Cronulla-Sutherland Sharks	25	3			12
2018	Cronulla-Sutherland Sharks	22	1			4
2019	Cronulla-Sutherland Sharks	22	1	2	1	9
	Totals	348	63	2	1	257

== Professional boxing record ==
19 fights	16 wins	2 losses
By knockout	8	1
By decision	8	1
Draws	1	

No.	Result	Record	Opponent	Type	Round, time	Date	Location	Notes
20	Loss	16–3–1	Nelson Asofa-Solomona	KO	1	06 Nov 2026	TikTok Entertainment Centre, Sydney, Australia	
19	Win	16–2–1	Sonny Bill Williams	SD	8	16 Jul 2025	Qudos Bank Arena, Sydney, Australia	
18	Win	15–2–1	Justin Hodges	UD	6	23 Nov 2022	ICC Sydney, Sydney, Australia	
17	Win	14–2–1	Justin Hodges	TKO	3 (4), 1:40	15 Sep 2022	Nissan Arena, Brisbane, Australia	
16	Win	13–2–1	Ben Hannant	UD	4	15 Sep 2022	Nissan Arena, Brisbane, Australia	
15	Loss	12–2–1	Kris Terzievski	UD	10	11 May 2022	Entertainment Centre, Newcastle, Australia	For ANBF Australasian and vacant Australian heavyweight titles
14	Win	12–1–1	Darcy Lussick	TKO	3 (3), 1:28	22 Dec 2021	The Star Event Centre, Sydney, Australia	
13	Loss	11–1–1	Justis Huni	TKO	10 (10), 1:18	16 Jun 2021	ICC Sydney, Sydney, Australia	For Australian heavyweight title
12	Win	11–0–1	Lucas Browne	TKO	1 (6), 1:55	21 Apr 2021	WIN Entertainment Stadium, Wollongong, Australia	
11	Win	10–0–1	Mark Hunt	UD	6	16 Dec 2020	Bankwest Stadium, Sydney, Australia	
10	Draw	9–0–1	Barry Hall	MD	6	15 Nov 2019	Margaret Court Arena, Melbourne, Australia	
9	Win	9–0	John Hopoate	TKO	2 (6), 2:07	8 Feb 2019	Hordern Pavilion, Sydney, Australia	
8	Win	8–0	Puna Rasaubale	UD	6	10 Nov 2017	Cronulla Sutherland Leagues Club, Sydney, Australia	
7	Win	7–0	Ryan Carr-Ketu	KO	4 (6), 0:43	23 Dec 2016	Southern Cross Group Stadium, Sydney, Australia	
6	Win	6–0	Junior Paulo	UD	3	9 Dec 2016	Hordern Pavilion, Sydney, Australia	
5	Win	5–0	Herman Ene-Purcell	TKO	4 (5), 2:00	29 Jan 2016	Rumours International, Toowoomba, Australia	
4	Win	4–0	Bodene Thompson	UD	4	3 Nov 2015	SkyCity, Auckland, New Zealand	
3	Win	3–0	Randall Rayment	UD	4	31 Jan 2015	Allphones Arena, Sydney, Australia	
2	Win	2–0	Anthony Watts	TKO	1 (4), 1:28	3 Dec 2014	Hordern Pavilion, Sydney, Australia	
1	Win	1–0	Herman Ene-Purcell	TKO	2 (4), 2:53	19 Feb 2014	Hordern Pavilion, Sydney, Australia	

== Personal life ==
Paul is married to Anne, with who he has four children, three daughters and a son.

== Post NRL and Television career ==
Gallen has had several presenting roles over the years.

From 2013 until 2015, Gallen was a panelist on SportsFan Clubhouse alongside Renee Gartner and Mieke Buchan and hosted by Bill Woods. The show was a sports program that at aired on 7mate.

Since 2018, he has appeared on 100% Footy alongside James Bracey and Phil Gould - a rugby league show that airs on Monday nights on Channel Nine. Gallen has appeared sometimes on Sports Sunday and Nine's Rugby League Coverage.

Before the start of the 2020 State of Origin series, Daily Telegraph journalist Dean Ritchie described the Queensland team as the worst Maroons side in origin history. Before Game 3, Gallen doubled down on this statement saying "I would much rather have played against this side than any of the teams I ever played (against). In the past 15-20 years, I'd probably say this is the worst team. There you go, let's fire them up even more". Queensland would go on to win Game 3 and shock New South Wales to win the series.

In the aftermath of the New South Wales loss, Gallen defended his comments saying that they were fair and justified. He went on to say "There was one person to come from Queensland and stick up for the current side and that was their coach from Wayne Bennett, There wasn't a single other person, these staunch Queenslanders come from nowhere. No one said a word after my comments on Monday or after the New South Wales journalist's comments from a couple of weeks ago. All of sudden, in hindsight and they've won the series, they come from everywhere. "I didn't know I was so popular. I had 5000 messages today on social media".

In 2024, Gallen would be named as part of the extended cast for ABC series Plum. Gallen would film a cameo appearance for the series.

On 31 August 2025, The Sharks announced that Gallen had re-joined the team as an appointment on the Board of Directors.

== Honours ==
=== Individual ===
- 3x Dally M Lock of the Year: 2011, 2012, 2017
- 3x RLIF Lock of the Year: 2008, 2011, 2012
- 2x Harry Sunderland Medal: 2010, 2011
- RLW Player of the Year: 2010
- Brad Fittler Medal: 2011
- Wally Lewis Medal: 2014
- Peter Frilingos Memorial Award: 2011

=== Cronulla Sharks ===
- 2016 NRL Grand Final Winners
- 2017 World Club Series Runner-up
- Cronulla Sharks Life Member

=== New South Wales ===
- State of Origin Series Wins: 2014

=== Australia ===
- Rugby League World Cup: 2013
- Rugby League Four Nations: 2009, 2011

== See also ==
- List of players who have played 300 NRL games
