= Bowie Tupou =

Australian boxer (born 1982)

Personal information
- Nickname: Bo
- Nationality: Australian
- Born: Suliasi Tupou Ahio; 3 August 1982 (age 43)
- Height: 1.89 m (6 ft 2 1/2 in)
- Weight: Heavyweight

Boxing career
- Reach: 1.92 m (75 1/2 in)
- Stance: Orthodox

Boxing record
- Total fights: 34
- Wins: 28
- Win by KO: 20
- Losses: 6

Suliasi Tupou Ahio (born 3 August 1982), better known as Bowie Tupou, is an Australian professional boxer.

Tupou has peaked at 13th in the WBO rankings after winning the WBO African title against Hunter Sam in March 2015. Tupou lost the title in August 2015 against Joseph Parker.

== Early life ==
Tupou moved to Mt Druitt at age of 11, then to Newtown, New South Wales when he got married. Before becoming a boxer, Bowie played professional rugby league football in Australia for the Penrith Panthers in the under 21s. In 2001 Tupou was selected to tour New Zealand, which included a game against Southland under-21 in Queenstown. His NRL career never happened due to being sucked into the booze culture and he fell into that trap like many youngsters can. Tupou wife was the first person to suggest boxing as a sport, to help get him back on track and install some discipline in his life.

== Professional boxing career ==
He began his boxing career training with Johnny Lewis, Australia's most well-known boxing coach, having trained Jeff Fenech, Jeff Harding, Virgil Hill and Kostya Tszyu. After only one amateur bout, he knocked out his opponent in the first round. Tupou made his pro debut on 18 February 2006 in South Windsor, New South Wales, Australia, against Brian Fitzgerald. Tupou won the evenly fought battle by a majority decision. Six months later on a rematch with Fitzgerald, Tupou picked up the lightly regarded New South Wales Heavyweight title. At the end of 2006 he settled in Los Angeles where he started training with Justin Fortune at the Pound4Pound Gym.

In 2007 he signed with Gary Shaw and made his U.S. debut on 7 September. In April 2008 he signed with a new coach Jeff Mayweather. He has beaten his first club fighters in Cisse Salif and Ray Hayes. In 2009 he was knocked out by club fighter Demetrice King but a 2011 knock out of Manuel Quezada and a points win over Donnell Holmes restored some credibility. Bowie now resides in Las Vegas, NV. In 2012 he was knocked out by Malik Scott and Bryant Jennings.

=== Returning to Australia ===
When returning to Australia in 2013, Tupou started training with Jeff Fenech. Since that return he had a three win streak with wins over Hunter Sam, Nick Guivas and Junior Maletino Iakopo. After the three wins Tupou received his first major world ranking, ranked 13th in WBO and winning the WBO African title. Five months after winning the title, Tupou suffered his fourth loss to Joseph Parker.

In 2016, Tupou fought a rematch against Hunter Sam after both boxers took the fight on a week's notice. Tupou won the fight by TKO. Tupou had his last regional title shot against the tallest boxer in the world, New Zealand American Julius Long. Long won the Interim WBA title by Split Decision, his biggest win of his career.

== Professional boxing titles ==
- Australian New South Wales State
  - Australia – New South Wales State heavyweight title (262½Ibs)
- World Boxing Organisation
  - WBO Africa heavyweight title (284½Ibs)

== Professional boxing record ==
37 fights	29 wins	8 losses
By knockout	20	6
By decision	9	2

No.	Result	Record	Opponent	Type	Round, time	Date	Location	Notes
37	Loss	29–8	Teremoana Teremoana	KO	1 (8), 1:14	29 Apr 2026	The Melbourne Pavilion, Melbourne, Australia	
36	Loss	29–7	Joseph Goodall	TKO	4 (10), 2:53	26 Apr 2025	Nissan Arena, Nathan, Australia	For WBA Oceania heavyweight title
35	Win	29–6	Arsene Fosso	SD	6	19 Oct 2024	Canberra Southern Cross Club, Woden Valley, Australia	
34	Win	28–6	Randall Rayment	KO	3 (10), 0:28	26 Apr 2019	Entertainment Center, Hurstville, Australia	Won vacant JNI heavyweight title
33	Win	27–6	Roger Izonritei	KO	1 (6) 1:58	2 Feb 2019	St Marys Band Club, St Marys, Australia	
32	Loss	26–6	Randall Rayment	SD	6	23 Nov 2018	Entertainment Centre, Hurstville, Australia	
31	Loss	26–5	Julius Long	SD	10	7 Oct 2016	Jupiters Hotel & Casino, Broadbeach, Australia	For WBA interim Oceania heavyweight title
30	Win	26–4	Hunter Sam	TKO	5 (6), 0:54	27 Feb 2016	Darwin Convention Centre, Darwin, Australia	
29	Loss	25–4	Joseph Parker	KO	1 (12), 1:03	1 Aug 2015	Stadium Southland, Invercargill, New Zealand	Lost WBO Africa heavyweight title; For WBA–PABA, WBO Oriental and vacant WBC–OPBF heavyweight titles
28	Win	25–3	Hunter Sam	SD	10	27 Mar 2015	Club Punchbowl, Punchbowl, Australia	Won vacant WBO Africa heavyweight title
27	Win	24–3	Nick Guivas	TKO	6 (8), 0:53	19 Mar 2014	Jupiters Hotel & Casino, Broadbeach, Australia	
26	Win	23–3	Junior Maletino Iakopo	UD	6	20 Dec 2013	Jupiters Hotel & Casino, Broadbeach, Australia	
25	Lose	22–3	Bryant Jennings	TKO	5 (12), 1:37	8 Dec 2012	McGonigle Hall, Philadelphia, Pennsylvania, U.S.	For IBF–USBA heavyweight title
24	Loss	22–2	Malik Scott	TKO	8 (8), 0:52	8 Sep 2012	Oracle Arena, Oakland, California, U.S.	
23	Win	22–1	Donnell Holmes	UD	10	17 Dec 2011	Boardwalk Hall, Atlantic City, New Jersey, U.S.	
22	Win	21–1	Manuel Quezada	KO	7 (10), 0:53	14 May 2011	Home Depot Center, Carson, California, U.S.	
21	Win	20–1	Andrew Greeley	UD	4	8 Apr 2011	Event Center, Laredo, Texas, U.S.	
20	Win	19–1	Alexis Mejias	RTD	2 (6), 3:00	21 May 2010	Capitale, New York City, New York, U.S.	
19	Loss	18–1	Demetrice King	KO	2 (8), 0:52	1 Aug 2009	Agua Caliente Casino, Rancho Mirage, California, U.S.	
18	Win	18–0	Chris Koval	TKO	3 (8), 0:15	9 May 2009	Hard Rock Hotel and Casino, Las Vegas, Nevada, U.S.	
17	Win	17–0	Marcus Rhode	TKO	1 (10), 1:21	28 Mar 2009	Buffalo Run Casino, Miami, Oklahoma, U.S.	
16	Win	16–0	Cisse Salif	UD	6	10 Jan 2009	Emerald Queen Casino, Tacoma, Washington, U.S.	
15	Win	15–0	Otis Tisdale	TKO	2 (10), 1:56	7 Jun 2008	Mohegan Sun Casino, Uncasville, Connecticut, U.S.	
14	Win	14–0	Ramon Hayes	UD	6	12 Apr 2008	St. Pete Times Forum, Tampa, Florida, U.S.	
13	Win	13–0	John Clark	RTD	4 (6), 3:00	22 Feb 2008	Doubletree Hotel, Ontario, California, U.S.	
12	Win	12–0	Jason Bergman	KO	2 (6), 1:14	30 Nov 2007	Chumash Casino Resort, Santa Ynez, California, U.S.	
11	Win	11–0	Harvey Jolly	KO	2 (6), 2:37	5 Oct 2007	Omega Products International, Corona, California, U.S.	
10	Win	10–0	John Clark	TKO	4 (6), 0:28	7 Sep 2007	Chumash Casino Resort, Santa Ynez, California, U.S.	
9	Win	9–0	Richard Tutaki	KO	3 (6), 1:30	10 Nov 2006	Wyong RSL Club, Wyong, Australia	
8	Win	8–0	Alex Mene	TKO	2 (6), 2:59	21 Oct 2006	Roundhouse, Uni of NSW, Kensington, Australia	
7	Win	7–0	Brian Fitzgerald	UD	6	8 Sep 2006	Wyong RSL Club, Wyong, Australia	
6	Win	6–0	Ramba Sithsianboh	TKO	1 (6), 1:09	4 Aug 2006	Croatian Club, Sydney, Australia	
5	Win	5–0	Terry Tuteru	TKO	1 (4), 1:56	14 Jul 2006	Greek Community Club, Sydney, Australia	
4	Win	4–0	Vai Toevai	KO	1 (6) 2:35	9 Jun 2006	Southport RSL Club, Southport, Australia	
3	Win	3–0	John Justice	KO	1 (8), 0:54	12 May 2006	Croatian Club, Sydney, Australia	Won vacant New South Wales State heavyweight title
2	Win	2–0	Corey Wainwright	KO	1 (6), 0:53	24 Mar 2006	Croatian Club, Sydney, Australia	
1	Win	1–0	Brian Fitzgerald	MD	6	18 Feb 2006	Windsor Rugby League Club, South Windsor, Australia	
