= Saint-Gall Cantatorium =

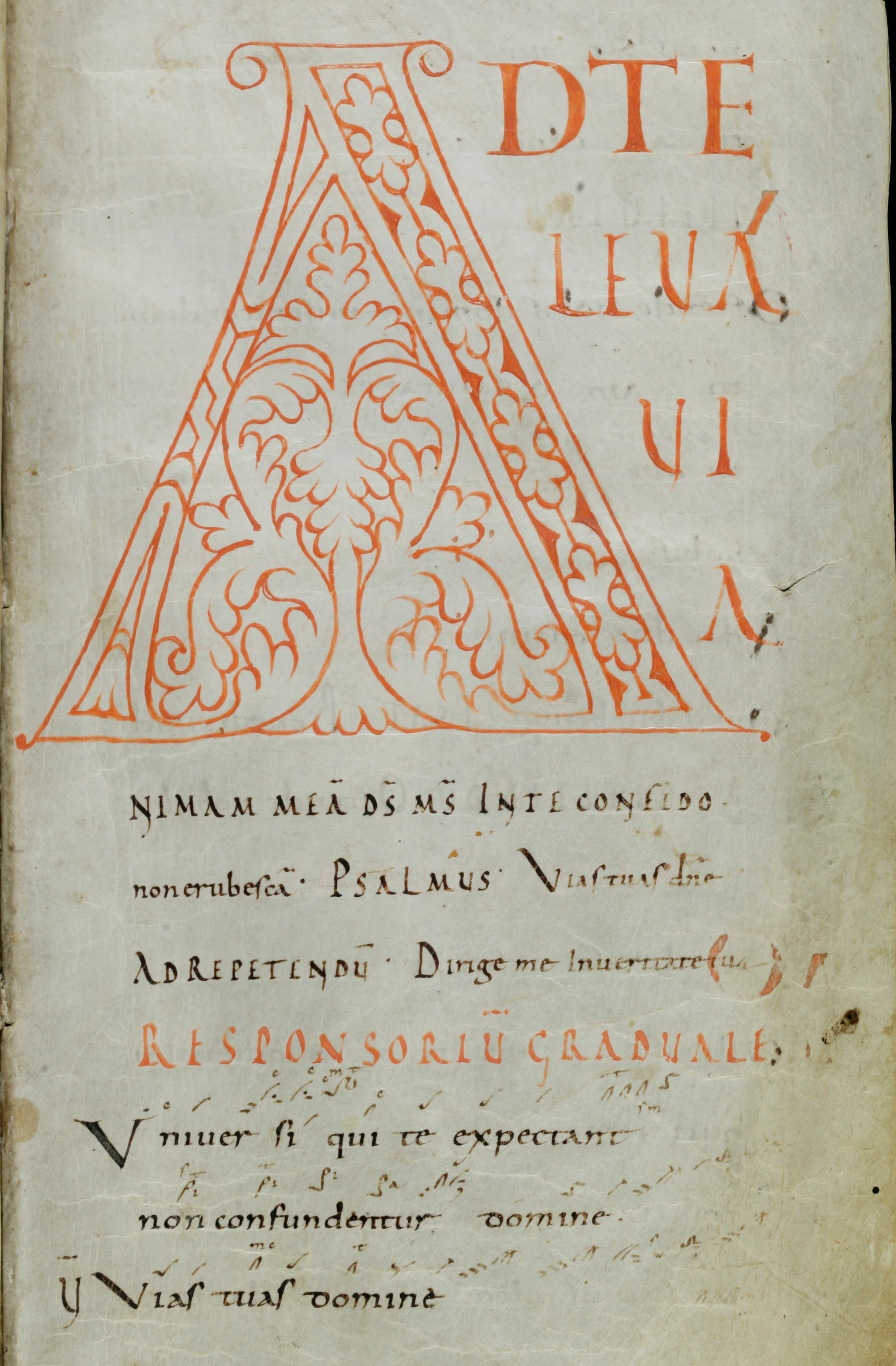
Introit and Gradual from St. Gallen, MS 359.

The Saint-Gall Cantatorium is the earliest surviving cantatorium of Gregorian chant. It was produced around 922–926 in the Abbey of Saint Gall and is still held in the abbey library.

== Sources ==
- Jacques Hourlier, La notation musicale des chants liturgiques latins, Abbaye Saint-Pierre, Solesmes 1996 (ISBN 978-2-85274-136-2) 72 p.
