= Jai Opetaia =

Australian boxer (born 1995)

Personal information
- Born: Jai Tapu Opetaia; 30 June 1995 (age 31) Sydney, Australia
- Height: 6 ft 2 in (188 cm)
- Weight: Cruiserweight; Heavyweight

Boxing career
- Reach: 76 in (193 cm)
- Stance: Southpaw

Boxing record
- Total fights: 31
- Wins: 31
- Win by KO: 24
Medal record
Men's Amateur boxing
Representing Australia
World Junior Championships
Gold medal – first place	2011 Astana	Light heavyweight
World Youth Championships
Bronze medal – third place	2012 Yerevan	Heavyweight

Jai Opetaia (born 30 June 1995) is an Australian professional boxer. He has held the Ring magazine cruiserweight title since 2022. He is a two-time cruiserweight world champion, having held the International Boxing Federation (IBF) title twice between 2022 and 2026. As an amateur, he won a bronze medal at the 2012 Youth World Championships and represented Australia at the 2012 Olympics and 2014 Commonwealth Games.

== Early life ==
Opetaia was born in Sydney to an Australian mother and a Samoan father. He comes from a boxing family of four generations on his father's side and three generations on his mother's side, as well as sharing notable relations to Australia's greatest ever football goal scorer Tim Cahill and former New Zealand international rugby league player Ben Roberts. He grew up in Watanobbi On the Central Coast of New South Wales. In mid-2020, Opetaia relocated his training base to the Gold Coast in an attempt to further his career and secure a world title boxing bout, a dream that would become a reality two years later in front of his new hometown fans at the Gold Coast Convention and Exhibition Centre.

== Amateur career ==
Less than a month after his 16th birthday, Opetaia travelled to Kazakhstan to compete in the 2011 Junior World Championships and would win the gold medal in the light heavyweight division by defeating Germany's Melvin Perry 5:3 in the final. His victory marked the first time an Australian had won a junior boxing world championship.

In February 2012, still aged 16, he travelled to Hobart to compete in the 2012 Australian Olympic qualifying tournament where he would win the gold medal in the heavyweight division. A month later he competed in the Oceanic Olympic qualifying tournament held in Canberra and once again emerged victorious in the heavyweight final by defeating New Zealander David Light 15:10. In doing so, Opetaia became the youngest boxer to ever make an Australian Olympic team.

In the lead up to the 2012 Olympics, Opetaia travelled to Armenia to compete in the heavyweight division of the AIBA Youth World Boxing Championships and claimed the bronze medal, losing a close 11:9 semi-final to eventual gold medalist Andrey Stotskiy from Russia. A month after his 17th birthday, he travelled to London to compete as the youngest boxer in the heavyweight division of the Olympics and was controversially defeated in the first round 12:11 by eventual bronze medalist Teymur Mammadov from Azerbaijan. In 2014, at the age of 19, Opetaia made the decision to end his amateur career in pursuit of a professional career.

== Professional career ==
=== Early career ===
Opetaia made his debut on 1 August 2015. He amassed a record of 11–0 from his debut to May 2017. Opetaia fought Daniel Ammann for the vacant WBC-OPBF and Australian cruiserweight titles on 15 July 2017. He won the fight by a ninth-round technical knockout. Opetaia was next scheduled to face Frankie Lopez for the vacant IBF Youth cruiserweight title on 22 October 2017. He won the fight by a first-round technical knockout.

Opetaia made his first Australian Cruiserweight title defence against Benjamin Kelleher on 17 January 2018. He won the fight by a third-round technical knockout. Opetaia fought for yet another regional title on 7 April 2018, when he was set to face Lukas Paszkowsky for the vacant WBO Asia-Pacific cruiserweight title. He won the fight by a second-round technical knockout. Opetaia made his first WBO Asia-Pacific cruiserweight title defence against Kurtis Pegoraro on 29 June 2018. The fight was simultaneously a fight for the vacant IBF Pan-Pacific cruiserweight title. He won the fight by a second-round knockout.

Opetaia fought Navosa Ioata for the vacant WBA Oceania interim cruiserweight title on 15 May 2019, and won the fight by an eight-round technical knockout. Opetaia made his first title defence two months later, on 27 July 2019, against Nikolas Charalampous, while also fighting for the vacant WBO Global cruiserweight title. He won the fight by unanimous decision. Opetaia made the first defence of these two titles, and fought for the inaugural IBF Asia-Oceania cruiserweight title, against Mark Flanagan on 16 November 2019. He won the fight by an eight-round technical knockout.

Opetaia was scheduled to defend his IBF Asia-Oceania and WBO Global cruiserweight titles in a rematch with Benjamin Kelleher on 22 October 2020. He won the fight by a sixth-round technical knockout.

=== IBF and The Ring cruiserweight champion ===
==== Opetaia vs. Briedis ====
Opetaia was scheduled to challenge the reigning IBF, The Ring and lineal cruiserweight champion Mairis Briedis on 6 April 2022. The bout was postponed on 16 February, as Briedis tested positive for COVID-19. The bout was rescheduled for 11 May, and was expected to take place at the Gold Coast Convention and Exhibition Centre in Broadbeach, Queensland, Australia. The bout was once again postponed on April 8, as Opetaia suffered a rib injury, and rescheduled for 2 July. Opetaia won the fight by unanimous decision, with scores of 116–112, 116–112 and 115–113. Opetaia boxed smartly and used his movement in the early rounds to accumulate points. His quick combinations helped maintain an edge over Briedis, who fought mostly on the counter, attempting to land his right uppercut and fight on the inside. He did have success in the close-range exchanges but was unable to dominate the fight. During the fight, Opetaia badly broke his jaw in two places. Unable to give an interview following the match, he was instead taken directly to the hospital to undergo surgery to repair the fractures.

==== Opetaia vs. Thompson ====
Opetaia was expected to face mandatory challenger Mateusz Masternak in early 2023, but was forced to undergo left shoulder surgery on 1 February 2023. He requested a 60-day medical extension from the IBF before entering into negotiations with Masternak, which was granted on 18 February The two camps failed to come to terms despite the extension and a pursed bid was called by the sanctioning body for July 15, 2023. Masternak withdrew from the bid a day before it was supposed to take place. The IBF removed Masternak's mandatory status the very next day and ordered Opetaia to face the No. 2 ranked cruiserweight contender Richard Riakporhe instead. Riakporhe himself withdrew from the negotiations on 8 August 2023, shortly before a scheduled purse bid hearing. The IBF designated former champion Mairis Briedis as the next mandatory challenger on 10 August 2023. The sanctioning body ordered the two to enter into negotiations that very same day. Opetaia's team requested an immediate purse bid in lieu of a negotiation period. The sanctioning body indefinitely suspended the purse bid hearing on 22 August. This allowed Opetaia to enter into negotiations with Jordan Thompson for a voluntary title defence that took place at the Wembley Arena in London, England on 30 September 2023.

Opetaia defeated Thompson via fourth-round knockout, retaining his IBF and Ring Magazine cruiserweight titles in a dominant performance. Opetaia took control from the opening bell. He staggered Thompson with a powerful left hand in the first round. In the third, Opetaia dropped Thompson with a three-punch combination. Despite beating the referee's count, he appeared dazed. Before the fourth round, Thompson's trainer, Tony Sims, warned him that he needed to see more from him or he would be forced to stop the fight. Only 20 seconds into the round, Opetaia landed a clean left hand that staggered Thompson once more before referee Howard Foster waved the fight off. During the post-fight interviews, Opetaia told DAZN that he felt the ring setup was designed for Thompson. He said, "They put me in this small ring thinking they were going to cut me off ... they underestimated [my power], and this is what happens." he then shouted, "I'm born for it, I live for it."

=== The Ring cruiserweight champion ===
==== Opetaia vs. Zorro ====
On 23 December 2023 in Riyadh, Saudi Arabia, Opetaia was expected to make the second defence of his IBF cruiserweight title against Ellis Zorro. During the fight week's early stages, Opetaia vacated the title when the IBF, the sanctioning body, insisted on a mandatory defence against former champion Mairis Briedis, who was recovering from an injury. Consequently, the IBF decided not to sanction the fight against Zorro. Opetaia won the fight by knockout in the first round. He reportedly earned a $680,000 fight purse.

=== IBF and The Ring cruiserweight champion ===
==== Opetaia vs. Briedis II ====
Opetaia was expected to face Mairis Briedis for the vacant IBF cruiserweight championship on the undercard of Tyson Fury vs. Oleksandr Usyk. The fight was initially expected to take place on 17 February 2024, at the Kingdom Arena in Riyadh, Saudi Arabia, but the entire event was later postponed after Tyson Fury suffered a facial injury in training. It was re-scheduled to 18 May 2024, and took place at the same venue as was originally planned. Opetaia defeated Briedis in the rematch by unanimous decision to become a two-time world champion and two-time IBF cruiserweight champion.

==== Opetaia vs. Massey ====
On 21 August 2024, it was announced that Opetaia would make his first defence of his second IBF cruiserweight title reign on 12 October on the Artur Beterbiev vs. Dmitry Bivol card, at Kingdom Arena in Riyadh, Saudi Arabia. His opponent was Jack Massey (22−2, 12 KOs).This was Opetaia's third consecutive fight in Riyadh. He had been calling for a unification against Chris Billam-Smith. Financial backer, Turki Al-Sheikh said, “We will prepare big fights for Opetaia in the future and we will sponsor him." The IBF approved sanctioning of the bout at the request of Opetaia's team. Massey was ranked #11 by the organization. They stated that the winner must defend the IBF title against mandatory challenger Huseyin Cinkara by 20 January 2025. Opetaia retained his titles in a one-sided fight, stopping Massey in the sixth round. He used his southpaw style and targeted Massey's body, which was effective in breaking down his defence. Massey was unable to mount a sustained attack, and mistakes in his defence contributed to the loss. Opetaia gained control from the opening bell, landing sharp lefts. Massey responded with single right hands to the head and body. In the second round, Opetaia increased his output, targeting Massey's body but was met with a right counter from Massey. Massey suffered a cut above his left eye. He then looked frustrated as he was caught with some shots after dropping his hands. The end came in the sixth, with Massey looking fatigued. The cut worsened. His trainer, Joe Gallagher, threw in the towel after two minutes, after Massey succumbed to intense pressure, leaving referee Steve Gray no option but to stop the fight. Opetaia praised Massey, stating he "knew Jack was gonna come to fight" and that he had "nothing but respect for him and his family." Massey did not complain about his corner stopping the fight, admitting defeat. Opetaia landed more than double the punches Massey did overall. 41% of Opetaia’s landed punches targeted Massey’s body. Opetaia landed 87 of 205 total punches (42.4%), and Massey landed 41 of 143 (28.7%). Neither fighter used the jab much.

==== Opetaia vs. Nyika ====
Opetaia faced David Nyika in defence of his IBF cruiserweight title on 8 January 2025. Nyika was a late replacement for the originally scheduled opponent Huseyin Cinkara. Opetaia successfully defended his cruiserweight titles with a fourth-round knockout victory. Both fighters began the bout aggressively, exchanging powerful shots. Opetaia delivered significant punches, while Nyika attempted to apply pressure with his own attacks. In the second round, the action persisted, with Opetaia effectively landing solid blows, particularly his right hooks. Nyika also landed some punches but faced challenges with Opetaia's counterattacks. Opetaia gradually gained control and began to dictate the pace of the fight. The fourth round proved to be pivotal, as Opetaia landed a powerful uppercut that brought Nyika to the canvas. Although Nyika managed to rise, he appeared visibly shaken. Opetaia took advantage of this moment, delivering a series of punishing shots that left Nyika face-down on the canvas, prompting the referee to halt the bout. The official stoppage time was 2:17. Following the conclusion of the fight, Nyika received medical attention after remaining motionless on the canvas for several minutes, but he eventually regained consciousness. The CompuBox stats revealed a clear performance difference between the boxers. Opetaia landed 74 punches out of 208 thrown (35.6%). In contrast, Nyika landed 44 punches from 190 thrown ( 23.2%). Opetaia expressed respect for his opponent, acknowledging the challenge he presented despite taking the fight on short notice. He anticipated a more tactical approach but was impressed by the opponent's willingness to engage in a tough, aggressive match. The fourth-round stoppage of Nyika by Opetaia was later named BoxingScene's Knockout of the Year.

==== Opetaia vs. Squeo ====
In March 2025, Matchroom Boxing announced Opetaia would make a second consecutive defence in Australia against 34-year-old Italian boxer Claudio Squeo (17–0, 9 KOs), with the bout originally set to take place on 13 May at the Gold Coast Convention Centre in Broadbeach. The bout was later pushed back to 8 June. This was Squeo's first bout outside of his native Italy. Promoter Eddie Hearn explained that he wanted to keep Opetaia busy in 2025 whilst waiting on potential unification fights. Opetaia disregarded his opponent, stating, "He’s a little bomber, he’s a 5ft 10in, comes forward. He’s nothing special, nothing I ain’t seen before. It’s another day in the office." Opetaia won by knockout in the fifth round, breaking Squeo's jaw. Following the fight, Opetaia called out WBO and WBA cruiserweight champion Gilberto Ramirez, saying "I'm chasing this unification fight and it's frustrating. Gilberto Ramirez, next fight, let's get it on. I'm chasing the belts. The fight is easy to be made. Let's do it."

==== Opetaia vs. Cinkara ====
On 19 August 2025, the IBF issued a directive for Opetaia to conduct a mandatory defence against Huseyin Cinkara (23–0, 19 KOs). The fight was initially planned for January 2025; however, Cinkara had to withdraw less than four weeks prior to the event due to torn ligaments sustained during training. Within a few days, talks began of Opetaia moving up to heavyweight to be Derek Chisora's 50th fight. Eddie Hearn, his promoter, expressed that competing against lower-tier opponents had become monotonous. He emphasized that if a title unification did not occur in the near future, Opetaia may consider transitioning out of the division. Opetaia promptly dismissed any rumours, stating that he was concentrating on unifying the cruiserweight division. The fight was officially scheduled for 6 December 2025, at the Gold Coast Convention Centre in Broadbeach, Australia. This fight will be Opetaia's third fight of the year and his third consecutive appearance at his hometown venue. Before the fight, there was a perception that Opetaia was involved in less competitive matchups while other cruiserweight titleholders addressed their circumstances. Opetaia expressed a desire to unify with the other champions in 2026. He mentioned that each fight was significant in his pursuit of becoming the undisputed champion. Additionally, he indicated interest in a potential future fight against light heavyweight champion David Benavidez. Opetaia stated that he did not want to expedite his career for financial reasons or succumbing to outside pressures. It was observed that his recent opponents had lacked star power. The fight was set to be broadcast on Stan, a pay-per-view platform. Tasman Fighters entered into a 12-month contract with the streaming service. There were concerns that this might restrict future matchups, especially with Gilberto Ramirez, who was exclusively fighting on DAZN.

Opetaia scored a devastating 8th-round knockout over Cinkara to retain his world titles, in what was described as a tough and competitive fight. Despite being the heavy favourite, Opetaia faced some adversity early in the fight, particularly in the second round when a right-hand counter from Cinkara rocked him and caused visible trouble. Cinkara's accurate counter-punching and jabs also caused damage around Opetaia's eye, making the early rounds highly competitive. By the sixth round, Cinkara's speed and accuracy began to fade, due to fatigue. Opetaia capitalized on Cinkara's exhaustion, pinning him to the ropes repeatedly and in the eighth round, Opetaia landed a powerful left-hand counter that floored Cinkara, who remained motionless for several minutes and required immediate medical attention. The fight was called off. After the fight, Opetaia was visibly frustrated, citing personal distractions and admitting he felt off his peak performance despite the victory. He said, "I feel like I just fought like s---, to be honest. You get these nights. We go back to the drawing board. I'm very disappointed in myself, I feel like I've let some people down with that performance. I made a lot of mistakes. I'm so pissed off."

Cinkara was taken to hospital, where he was required to stay for a minimum of two days following a serious injury sustained in the fight. He was released on the following Tuesday. The injuries included a brain contusion, a small brain bleed, and a fractured C1 vertebra, which is known as a Jefferson fracture and can pose life-threatening risks or lead to paralysis. Despite suffering a swollen right eye, Opetaia did not sustain any serious injuries and was cleared by doctors to resume normal activities.

=== Zuffa Boxing ===
On 17 January 2026, Zuffa Boxing, a new promotional firm, announced that they had agreed a deal to sign Opetaia, a move that surprised many in boxing. The deal was described as pivotal for Zuffa Boxing, bringing in a credible and high-profile champion on board. upon the news beoing reported, Opetaia posted: “Pumped for the future. Exciting times. Let’s get these big fights over the line. Unification [and] undisputed soon. Let’s go.” There were initial concerns around Zuffa Boxing not recognizing the already established sanctioning bodies. Opetaia and his team were very vocal about unifying and becoming the undisputed champion at cruiserweight. Opetaia’s manager, Mick Francis, confirmed that the unification of titles remained a key priority for Opetaia and clarified that the contract allowed Opetaia to fight for and unify the recognized titles, which aligned with his goals.

==== Opetaia vs. Glanton ====
On 10 February 2026, Zuffa Boxing announced that Opetaia would fight Brandon Glanton for the inaugural Zuffa Boxing cruiserweight title and also defend his Ring magazine cruiserweight title in the main event of Zuffa Boxing 04 at the Meta Apex in Las Vegas, Nevada, on 8 March 2026. Opetaia described Glanton as tough and gritty, calling it a dangerous fight. On 6 March, during the final press conference, it was confirmed after much debate that the IBF title would be on the line. Hours later, the IBF refused to sanction the bout, which meant if the fight went ahead, the title would become vacant. A sanctioning fee of $73,000 was reportedly paid to the IBF to cover the fees, however this was later returned on 7 March. Opetaia defeated Glanton via unanimous decision, winning all 12 rounds on the judges’ scorecards to claim the inaugural Zuffa Boxing cruiserweight championship. Opetaia dominated throughout the bout, using his superior footwork, accuracy, and control against Glanton, who came in with a reputation as a persistent, come-forward, durable fighter. Despite being one-sided, the fight saw multiple point deductions and stern referee warnings, which caused some interruptions in the action. Glanton had points deducted twice: once for holding in the sixth round and once for low blows in the eighth. In the eleventh round, Opetaia lost a point for holding. The scorecards read 119-106 across all three judges. Over the 12 rounds, Opetaia landed 250 punches compared to the 118 landed by Glanton. Opetaia was reportedly paid $1.5 million and Glanton was paid a $200,000 purse.

==== Lawsuit against IBF ====
On 24 March, the IBF once again stripped Opetaia of its cruiserweight title. The decision came due to the bout also involving the newly created Zuffa Boxing cruiserweight title, which the IBF did not recognize. The IBF’s rules (Rule 5.H) state that if a champion fights in an unsanctioned contest, even if victorious, the title must be declared vacant. On 19 March, the IBF board voted to vacate Opetaia’s title. Opetaia's attorney, Jordan T. Smith, alleged a conspiracy among the main sanctioning bodies and promoters to punish Opetaia for associating with Zuffa Boxing. The letter included names such as Eddie Hearn, citing public statements and insider communications.

On 14 July, Opetaia filed a lawsuit against the IBF in the United States District Court for the District of Nevada. The suit alleged that the IBF, along with other prominent figures in the sport, participated in an "industry-wide conspiracy" to punish him for signing with Zuffa Boxing and to "deter other athletes from doing the same". The lawsuit claimed that the IBF had initially approved and sanctioned his bout against Brandon Glanton, but withdrew its sanction less than 48 hours before the fight and stripped him of the cruiserweight title on 19 March. The complaint further alleged violations of the Muhammad Ali Boxing Reform Act and sought Opetaia's reinstatement as champion, monetary damages, legal costs, and an injunction preventing the IBF from recognising a new champion while the case was pending. IBF Championships Chairman George Martinez responded only that the organisation would "release a statement when it is appropriate."

==== Opetaia vs. Mikaelian ====
In June 2026, the WBC ordered their champion Noel Mikaelian to defend his WBC title against Benavidez, who had moved up to cruiserweight and held the WBA and WBO titles, meaning the fight would have been a three-belt unification. On 4 August, it was announced that Opetaia would make the first defence of his Zuffa title on the Ryan Garcia vs. Conor Benn undercard scheduled for 12 September in Las Vegas against Mikaelian. However it was stated that taking the fight could likely cost Mikaelian the WBC title and may also expose him to legal action from promoter Don King. WBC president Mauricio Sulaimán publicly stated that Mikaelian could be stripped of the title if he chose to fight Opetaia instead of Benavidez. According to Dan Rafael, Don King and Benavidez's promoter, Sampson Lewkowicz, had already reached an agreement for a Mikaelian-Benavidez fight. Mikaelian's team disputed claims that a genuine offer for the Benavidez fight was ever formally presented. On the fight being announced, Opetaia said, "This is a huge card, and I look forward to showing the world once again why I'm the best cruiserweight on the planet." He criticised Benavidez, saying, "Credit to Noel for stepping up to the plate while others, yes, David Benavidez, I'm talking about you, continue to run and hide." Despite the controversy, Mikaelian stated that he intended to "defend my world championship" and described the contest as "the fight I've wanted since becoming a two-time world champion".

==== Cancelled Deontay Wilder fight ====
It was first reported on 10 October 2026 by Dan Rafael, that Opetaia was moving up to heavyweight to fight former world champion Deontay Wilder (45–4–1, 43 KOs). Shelly Finkel, Wilder's manager, said a fight against Oleksandr Usyk fell apart after Usyk asked for more money. He was then approached by Turki Alalshikh for Wilder to fight Opetaia on the undercard of the mega heavyweight showdown between Tyson Fury and Anthony Joshua, on 11 December 2026, at the Principality Stadium in Cardiff. An agreement was reached on 31 October between the two teams. The fight was made official and announced on 4 November. On 17 November, it was reported that Opetaia had pulled out of the fight. He later confirmed it was due to an hand injury and his team confirmed that he would remain at cruiserweight for his next bout.

== Professional boxing record ==
31 fights	31 wins	0 losses
By knockout	24	0
By decision	7	0

No.	Result	Record	Opponent	Type	Round, time	Date	Location	Notes
31	Win	31–0	Noel Mikaelian	TKO	9 (12), 1:30	12 Sep 2026	T-Mobile Arena, Paradise, Nevada, U.S.	Retained Zuffa Boxing and The Ring cruiserweight titles; Won vacant WBA (Regular) cruiserweight title
30	Win	30–0	Brandon Glanton	UD	12	8 Mar 2026	Meta Apex, Enterprise, Nevada, U.S.	Retained The Ring cruiserweight title; Won inaugural Zuffa Boxing cruiserweight title
29	Win	29–0	Huseyin Cinkara	KO	8 (12), 0:36	6 Dec 2025	Convention & Exhibition Centre, Gold Coast, Australia	Retained IBF and The Ring cruiserweight titles
28	Win	28–0	Claudio Squeo	KO	5 (12), 0:36	8 Jun 2025	Convention & Exhibition Centre, Gold Coast, Australia	Retained IBF and The Ring cruiserweight titles
27	Win	27–0	David Nyika	KO	4 (12), 2:17	8 Jan 2025	Convention & Exhibition Centre, Gold Coast, Australia	Retained IBF and The Ring cruiserweight titles
26	Win	26–0	Jack Massey	TKO	6 (12), 2:00	12 Oct 2024	Kingdom Arena, Riyadh, Saudi Arabia	Retained IBF and The Ring cruiserweight titles
25	Win	25–0	Mairis Briedis	UD	12	18 May 2024	Kingdom Arena, Riyadh, Saudi Arabia	Retained The Ring cruiserweight title; Won vacant IBF cruiserweight title
24	Win	24–0	Ellis Zorro	KO	1 (12), 2:56	23 Dec 2023	Kingdom Arena, Riyadh, Saudi Arabia	Retained The Ring cruiserweight title
23	Win	23–0	Jordan Thompson	TKO	4 (12), 0:20	30 Sep 2023	OVO Arena Wembley, London, England	Retained IBF and The Ring cruiserweight titles
22	Win	22–0	Mairis Briedis	UD	12	2 Jul 2022	Convention & Exhibition Centre, Gold Coast, Australia	Won IBF and The Ring cruiserweight titles
21	Win	21–0	Daniel Russell	TKO	3 (8), 1:44	4 Dec 2021	Fortitude Music Hall, Brisbane, Australia	
20	Win	20–0	Benjamin Kelleher	TKO	6 (10), 1:50	22 Oct 2020	Fortitude Music Hall, Brisbane, Australia	Retained IBF Asia-Oceania and WBO Global cruiserweight titles
19	Win	19–0	Mark Flanagan	TKO	8 (10), 3:00	16 Nov 2019	Hordern Pavilion, Sydney, Australia	Retained WBA Oceania and WBO Global cruiserweight titles; Won inaugural IBF Asia-Oceania cruiserweight title
18	Win	18–0	Nikolas Charalampous	UD	10	27 Jul 2019	Luna Park, Sydney, Australia	Retained WBA Oceania interim cruiserweight title; Won vacant WBO Global cruiserweight title
17	Win	17–0	Navosa Ioata	TKO	8 (10), 1:13	15 May 2019	The Star, Sydney, Australia	Won vacant WBA Oceania interim cruiserweight title
16	Win	16–0	Kurtis Pegoraro	KO	2 (10), 1:25	29 Jun 2018	Pullman Hotel and Resort, Brisbane, Australia	Retained WBO Asia-Pacific cruiserweight title; Won vacant IBF Pan-Pacific cruiserweight title
15	Win	15–0	Lukas Paszkowsky	TKO	2 (10), 2:35	7 Apr 2018	Convention & Exhibition Centre, Brisbane, Australia	Won vacant WBO Asia-Pacific cruiserweight title
14	Win	14–0	Benjamin Kelleher	TKO	3 (10), 2:36	17 Jan 2018	The Star, Sydney, Australia	Retained Australian cruiserweight title
13	Win	13–0	Frankie Lopez	TKO	1 (10), 2:55	21 Oct 2017	Function Centre, Melbourne, Australia	Won vacant IBF Youth cruiserweight title
12	Win	12–0	Daniel Ammann	TKO	9 (10), 1:49	15 Jul 2017	Wests City Club, Newcastle, Australia	Won vacant WBC-OPBF and Australian cruiserweight titles
11	Win	11–0	Moses Havea	TKO	2 (8), 1:03	12 May 2017	North Sydney Leagues Club, Sydney, Australia	Retained ANBF New South Wales heavyweight title
10	Win	10–0	Kyle Brumby	TKO	2 (8), 1:26	8 Apr 2017	Doltone House, Sydney, Australia	
9	Win	9–0	Togasilimai Letoa	TKO	2 (4), 0:30	10 Feb 2017	Faleata Sporting Complex, Apia, Samoa	
8	Win	8–0	Isileli Fa	TKO	3 (6), 0:36	23 Dec 2016	Southern Cross Group Stadium, Sydney, Australia	
7	Win	7–0	Peter Brennan	KO	1 (8), 2:46	9 Dec 2016	Hordern Pavilion, Sydney, Australia	Won vacant ANBF New South Wales heavyweight title
6	Win	6–0	Uria Afamasaga	TKO	2 (4), 0:37	14 Oct 2016	The Silverdome, Launceston, Australia	
5	Win	5–0	Sefo Falekaono	KO	6 (6), 1:11	22 Jul 2016	Mediterranean House, Sydney	
4	Win	4–0	Orlando Vazquez	PTS	4	23 Apr 2016	Centro de Usos Múltiples, Los Mochis, Mexico	
3	Win	3–0	Randall Rayment	UD	6	28 Nov 2015	Mansfield Tavern, Brisbane, Australia	
2	Win	2–0	Rob Manual	TKO	1 (4), 2:46	14 Aug 2015	Melbourne Pavilion, Melbourne, Australia	
1	Win	1–0	Isileli Fa	UD	4	1 Aug 2015	Stadium Southland, Invercargill, New Zealand	

== See also ==
- List of IBF world champions
- List of male boxers
- List of southpaw stance boxers
- List of The Ring world champions
- List of world cruiserweight boxing champions
- List of Zuffa Boxing world champions

Sporting positions
Regional boxing titles
Vacant Title last held by Paul Ogedengbe	ANBF New South Wales heavyweight champion 9 December 2016 – 15 July 2017; Won Australian title	Vacant Title next held by Matthew Davoren
Vacant Title last held by Danny Green	Australian cruiserweight champion 15 July 2017 – 2018; Vacated	Vacant Title next held by Jayden Joseph
Vacant Title last held by Anthony McCracken	OPBF cruiserweight champion 15 July 2017 – 2 July 2022; Won world title	Vacant Title next held by Muhetaer Maihemut
Vacant Title last held by Dennis Ronert	IBF Youth cruiserweight champion 21 October 2017 – 2 July 2022; Won world title	Vacant
Vacant Title last held by Ismail Sillakh	WBO Asia Pacific cruiserweight champion 7 April 2018 – 2019; Vacated	Vacant Title next held by Kamshybek Kunkabayev
Vacant Title last held by Mosese Sorovi	IBF Pan Pacific cruiserweight champion 29 June 2018 – 2019; Vacated	Vacant Title next held by Benjamin Kelleher
New title	WBO Global cruiserweight champion 27 July 2019 – 2022; Vacated	Vacant Title next held by Brandon Glanton
New title	IBF Asia Oceania cruiserweight champion 16 November 2019 – 2 July 2022; Won world title	Vacant
Promotion world boxing titles
Inaugural champion	Zuffa Boxing cruiserweight champion 8 March 2026 – present	Incumbent
Major world boxing titles
Preceded by Mairis Briedis	IBF cruiserweight champion 2 July 2022 – 18 December 2023; Stripped	Vacant Title next held by Himself
Preceded by Mairis Briedis	The Ring cruiserweight champion 2 July 2022 – present	Incumbent
Vacant Title last held by Himself	IBF cruiserweight champion 18 May 2024 – 23 March 2026; Stripped	Vacant
Vacant Title last held by Ryad Merhy	WBA cruiserweight champion Regular title 12 September 2026 – present	Incumbent
Awards
Previous: George Kambosos Jr. W 12 vs. Teófimo López	The Ring Upset of the Year; W 12 vs. Mairis Briedis I 2022	Next: Rafael Espinoza W12 vs. Robeisy Ramírez
