= Adam Watt =

Australian boxer

- Born: 10 November 1967 (age 59); Manly, New South Wales, Australia
- Other names: Lights Out, The Technician
- Height: 1.92 m (6 ft 4 in)
- Weight: 86.5 kg (191 lb; 13.62 st)
- Style: Seidokaikan karate
- Trainer: Tim Riley, Kazuyoshi Ishii; Chan Cheuk-fai Mark Pitts, Jeff Fenech, Johnny Lewis

Professional boxing record
- Total: 18
- Wins: 14
- By knockout: 14
- Losses: 4
- By knockout: 4

Kickboxing record
- Total: 50
- Wins: 37
- By knockout: 30
- Losses: 12
- Draws: 1
- Last updated on: 3 October 2021

Adam Watt (born 10 November 1967) is an Australian former boxer and kickboxer. He has studied many forms of martial arts, kickboxing, Zen Chi Ryu, Seido-kaikan karate, and boxing. Watt became the first non Japanese live-in student of Seidokaikan and the first foreigner to reach the final of the Karate World Cup. His nickname was "The Technician" because of his high level karate and boxing skills, and one punch knock out power. He has won many world kickboxing titles, and reached the top ten of the highly respected World Boxing Council's and World Boxing Organisation's (W.B.C and WBO) Cruiserweight ratings. In 2000, he challenged WBO cruiserweight champion Johnny Nelson for his title. Watt holds the notable distinction of being the first athlete to fight for world Karate, Kickboxing, Shootboxing and Boxing titles.

Watt defeated Manson Gibson in Japan to win the World Shootboxing light-heavyweight title. Watt won the Australian Cruiserweight title in March 2000 in the ANBF "Fight of the Year" against Victorian Tosca Petridis, and was the first Australian to win the Commonwealth Cruiserweight Boxing title. Adam also achieved success in Japan's K-1 Kickboxing tournaments, winning K-1 Oceania, knocking out highly regarded South African Mike Bernardo in 2001 amongst other great victories.

== Arrest and assault and fight for justice ==
In September 2008, Watt was arrested for conspiring to import chemical precursors to the drug methamphetamine. While Watt was on remand awaiting trial, he was hit from behind with a sandwich toaster inside a pillow case. When ambulance officers reached Watt he was clinically dead, but they managed to revive him at the scene. The extent of his injuries has not been made public. Following the attempt on his life, Adam was held in maximum security conditions and denied urgent medical treatment for nearly one year. His condition continued to deteriorate until eventually a brain injury specialist was brought to the jail to examine him. A Magistrate later described his untreated injuries as "life-threatening".

"I would think that blow that we saw on the video, it could have easily have killed him. … he is lucky he is alive, he is badly injured. Dr Adler's report expressly says this is urgent, this is a real worry … I have no faith in the Justice Health system – None at all."

"I am not going to countenance a situation whereby even in a strong case, in a very serious case like this, a person is to be almost literally sacrificed, that is, Mr Watt is put at extreme risk of physical maiming through the consequences of his injury or even worse perhaps. It is highly speculative to say he will die, he may not, but even if it is only maiming there is a great risk." ruled Magistrate Pierce

Upon his release, Watt was admitted as an outpatient at the Royal Rehabilitation Centre Sydney / brain injury clinic for injuries untreated: "Global cognitive defects: Concentration problems, memory difficulties, and executive dysfunction. As well as post-traumatic stress disorder, including hypervigilance, re-experiencing the trauma, a persistent feeling of being on edge, thoughts racing and sleep disturbance". Due to the year-long delay in receiving a medical diagnosis, Watt's treatment focused on providing him with the tools to live with his disability rather than repairing the damage.

Whilst undergoing medical treatment, Watt embarked on what one legal practitioner described in court as "a crusade" to not only defend himself but also to have the Australian Human Rights Commission hold NSW Corrective Services accountable for his mistreatment.

In 2014 Watt was found unfit to stand trial on the import charge and the Crown withdrew the Supply charge.

In 2018, Adam Watt was awarded compensation against the State for failing its duty of care. The 2018 findings of the Honourable Justice Garling in the NSW Supreme Court, Watt v State of NSW [2018] NSWSC 1926 which considered the s54 Civil Liability Act 2002 (NSW) Justice Garling ruled against the State. "The risk of Mr. Watt suffering physical harm was reasonably foreseeable and not insignificant".

In assessing the injuries, the State acknowledged that the 15% permanent impairment threshold had been exceeded. Consequently, due to the State's breach of duty of care, the Court found that Watt had sustained a traumatic brain injury and a permanent disability

In 2023, the Australian Human Rights Commission (AHRC) found that Corrective Services NSW, acting on behalf of the Commonwealth, had denied Adam Watt his human rights.

The president of the AHRC found that while Watt was held on remand, he was treated in a manner inconsistent with his right to be treated with dignity and humanity under Article 10(1) of the ICCPR. The president also found that Watt was denied his right to communicate in confidence with legal counsel of his choosing (protected by article 14(3)(b) of the ICCPR) and his right to privacy (protected by article 17 of the ICCPR).

== Career ==
- Kickboxing
  - 2002 K-1 World Grand Prix Preliminary Melbourne Champion
  - 2001 K-1 World Grand Prix in Fukuoka Repechage B Runner-Up
  - 2001 K-1 World Grand Prix in Osaka Runner-Up
  - 2000 ISKA World International Rules Light Cruiserweight Champion
  - 1997 ISKA World Muay Thai Light Cruiserweight Champion
  - 1995 Shoot Boxing World Heavyweight Champion
  - 1993 UKF World Cruiserweight Champion
  - WKA World Cruiserweight Champion
- Boxing
  - 2000–01 British Commonwealth Cruiserweight Champion
  - 2000 Australian Cruiserweight Champion
  - 1999-00 OPBF Cruiserweight Champion (1 title defense)
  - 1999 OBA Cruiserweight Champion (1 title defense)
  - 1997–98 PABA Cruiserweight Champion

| Previous champion: Bruce Scott | British Commonwealth 10th Cruiserweight champion 24 June 2000 – 2001 | Next champion: Bruce Scott |
| Previous champion: Tosca Petridis | Australian Cruiserweight 13th champion 24 March 2000 – 2000 | Next champion: Daniel Rowsell |
| Previous champion: Mosese Sorovi | OPBF Cruiserweight 8th champion 17 September 1999 – July 2000 | Next champion: Roman Kovalchuk |
| Previous champion: Phil Gregory | OBA Cruiserweight champion 16 January 1999 – 5 April 1999 | Next champion: unknown |
| Previous champion: Valery Vikhor | PABA Cruiserweight 3rd champion 6 December 1997 – 5 April 1998 | Next champion: Valery Vikhor |

== Boxing record ==
Boxing Record
14 Wins (14 (T)KO's), 4 Losses
| Date | Result | Opponent | Venue | Location | Method | Round | Time | Record |
| 2001-02-17 | Loss | (South Africa) Sebastiaan Rothmann | Carnival City Casino | Brakpen, South Africa | KO | 8 (12) | | 14–4 |
Fight was for Rothmann's W.B.U. Cruiserweight World title.
| 2000-10-07 | Loss | (England) Johnny Nelson | Doncaster Dome | Doncaster, England, UK | KO | 5 (12) | 2:12 | 14–3 |
Fight was for Nelon's W.B.O. Cruiserweight World title.
| 24 Jun 2000 | Win | (England) Bruce Scott | Hampden Park | Glasgow, Scotland, UK | TKO | 4 (12) | | 14–2 |
Wins vacant Commonwealth (British Empire) Cruiserweight title.
| 2000-03-24 | Win | (Greece) Tosca Petridis | Hornsby RSL Club | Sydney, Australia | TKO | 7 (12) | 2:36 | 13–2 |
Wins Petridis's Australian Cruiserweight title and retains O.P.B.F. Cruiserweight title.
| 2000-02-04 | Win | (Australia) Caine Melbourne | Star City Casino | Sydney, Australia | KO | 3 (8) | | 12–2 |
| 1999-10-16 | Win | (New Zealand) Lightning Lupe | Omnisports Stadium | Nouméa, New Caledonia | TKO | 4 (12) | | 11–2 |
Retains O.B.A. Cruiserweight title.
| 1999-09-17 | Win | (Australia) Mosese Sorovi | Manly Warringah Leagues Club | Sydney, Australia | TKO | 1 (12) | 2:04 | 10–2 |
Wins Sorovi's O.P.B.F. Cruiserweight title.
| 1999-08-05 | Win | (Australia) Phil Gregory | Willoughby Town Hall | Sydney, Australia | KO | 2 (6) | | 9–2 |
| 1999-03-15 | Loss | (Guyana) Wayne Braithwaite | Star City Casino | Sydney, Australia | KO | 1 (12) | 2:37 | 8–2 |
Fight was for vacant W.B.U. Cruiserweight World title.
| 1999-01-16 | Win | (Australia) Phil Gregory | Alexandria Basketball Stadium | Sydney, Australia | TKO | 3 (12) | | 8–1 |
Wins vacant O.B.A. Cruiserweight title.
| 1998-08-27 | Win | (New Zealand) Simon Whiu | South Sydney Junior Rugby League Club | Sydney, Australia | KO | 3 | | 7–1 |
| 1998-04-05 | Loss | (Ukraine) Valeriy Vykhor | Newcastle Entertainment Centre | Newcastle, New South Wales | TKO | 1 (12) | | 6–1 |
Loses P.A.B.A. Cruiserweight title.
| 1998-02-28 | Win | (Australia) Dean Turvey | Parramatta RSL Club | Sydney, Australia | KO | 2 (10) | 2:43 | 6–0 |
| 1997-12-06 | Win | (Australia) Kevin Wagstaff | Stockland Stadium | Townsville, Australia | KO | 1 (12) | 2:36 | 5–0 |
Wins vacant P.A.B.A. Cruiserweight title.
| 1997-09-12 | Win | (Fiji) Nat Ledua | Manly Warringah Leagues Club | Sydney, Australia | KO | 1 (10) | 1:55 | 4–0 |
| 1997-05-02 | Win | (Australia) Joe Kiwi Kingi | Dee Why RSL Club | Sydney, Australia | TKO | 3 (10) | 1:58 | 3–0 |
| 1997-02-10 | Win | (United States) Ernie Valentine | Memorial Auditorium | Sacramento, California, USA | KO | 1 | | 2–0 |
| 1996-11-22 | Win | (Australia) Phil Gregory | Manly Warringah Leagues Club | Sydney, Australia | KO | 1 (8) | | 1–0 |
Makes professional boxing debut.
Legend: Win Loss Draw/No contest Notes

== Kickboxing record ==
Kickboxing Record
37 Wins (30 (T)KO's, 7 Decisions), 12 Losses, 1 Draw
| Date | Result | Opponent | Event | Location | Method | Round | Time |
| 2002-10-11 | Loss | (Turkey) Gurkan Ozkan | | Sydney, Australia | Decision (Unanimous) | 6 | 2:00 |
| 2002-08-17 | Loss | (Czech Republic) Pavel Majer | K-1 World Grand Prix 2002 in Las Vegas Quarterfinals | Las Vegas, Nevada, USA | Decision (Unanimous) | 3 | 3:00 |
| 2002-02-18 | Win | (New Zealand) Andrew Peck | K-1 World Grand Prix 2002 Preliminary Melbourne Final | Melbourne, Australia | KO | 1 | 1:50 |
Wins the K-1 World Grand Prix 2002 Preliminary Melbourne and qualifies for the K-1 World Grand Prix 2002 in Las Vegas.
| 2002-02-18 | Win | (New Zealand) Jason Suttie | K-1 World Grand Prix 2002 Preliminary Melbourne Semifinals | Melbourne, Australia | Decision (Unanimous) | 3 | 3:00 |
| 2002-02-18 | Win | (Samoa) Clay Aumitagi | K-1 World Grand Prix 2002 Preliminary Melbourne Quarterfinals | Melbourne, Australia | TKO | 2 | 1:48 |
| 2001-12-08 | Loss | (South Africa) Mike Bernardo | K-1 World Grand Prix 2001 Reserve fight | Tokyo, Japan | Decision (Unanimous) | 3 | 3:00 |
| 2001-10-08 | Loss | (New Zealand) Mark Hunt | K-1 World Grand Prix 2001 in Fukuoka Final | Fukuoka, Japan | TKO (Doctor stoppage) | 3 | 1:38 |
Despite defeat, will be invited to the K-1 World Grand Prix 2001 as a reservist.
| 2001-10-08 | Win | (South Africa) Mike Bernardo | K-1 World Grand Prix 2001 in Fukuoka Semifinals | Fukuoka, Japan | TKO (2 knockdowns/Punch) | 1 | 2:27 |
| 2001-04-29 | Loss | (France) Jérôme Le Banner | K-1 World Grand Prix 2001 in Osaka Final | Osaka, Japan | KO (Punches) | 1 | 0:46 |
| 2001-04-29 | Win | (Australia) Peter Graham | K-1 World Grand Prix 2001 in Osaka Semifinals | Osaka, Japan | KO (Punch) | 2 | 1:29 |
| 2001-04-29 | Loss | (New Zealand) Ray Sefo | K-1 World Grand Prix 2001 in Osaka Quarterfinals | Osaka, Japan | TKO (Right hook) | 1 | 2:20 |
Despite defeat, advances to semifinals due to injury suffered by Ray Sefo.
| 1996-06-02 | Loss | (Netherlands) Perry Telgt | K-1 Fight Night II | Zurich, Switzerland | TKO (Doctor stoppage) | 3 | 1:05 |
| 1996 | Win | (Netherlands) Errol Parris | | Sydney, Australia | KO (Left hook) | 2 | 1:14 |
Retains the UKF World Cruiserweight title.
| 1995-10-27 | Win | (United States) Bill Lasfar | Shoot Boxing S-cup BOMBER | Tokyo, Japan | KO | 2 | 3:40 |
Wins the vacant Shoot Boxing World Heavyweight title.
| 1995-08-24 | Win | (United States) Manson Gibson | Shoot Boxing S-CUP Thunder and lightning | Tokyo, Japan | Decision | 5 | 3:00 |
| 1994-05-08 | Loss | (Russia) Artem Tonoyan | K-2 Plus Tournament 1994 Quarterfinals | Amsterdam, Netherlands | KO | 1 | |
| 1993-12-29 | Loss | (Netherlands) Ernesto Hoost | K-2 Grand Prix '93 Semifinals | Tokyo, Japan | TKO (2 knockdowns/Right high kick) | 1 | 2:13 |
| 1993-12-29 | Win | (France) Bob Zengifo | K-2 Grand Prix '93 Quarterfinals | Tokyo, Japan | KO (Spinning back fist) | 1 | 0:43 |
| 1993-11-15 | Win | (Netherlands) Jan Lomulder | K-1 Andy's Glove | Tokyo, Japan | TKO (Doctor stoppage) | 2 | 2:36 |
| 1993-09-04 | Win | (Netherlands) Gerard Gordeau | K-1 Illusion | Tokyo, Japan | KO (Spinning back fist) | 2 | 2:07 |
| 1993-06-25 | Win | (United States) Lavelle Robinson | K-1 Sanctuary III | Osaka, Japan | Decision (Unanimous) | 5 | 3:00 |
Wins the UKF World Cruiserweight title.
| 1993-05-22 | Win | (Japan) Kaneko Machida | AJKF Evolution Step-3 | Tokyo, Japan | TKO (Referee stoppage/Right low kick) | 4 | 2:22 |
| 1993-03-30 | Win | (Japan) Nobuki Iwashita | Korakuen Experiment: Round 2 | Tokyo, Japan | KO | 1 | 1:56 |
| 1993-03-30 | Win | (Japan) Shinjiro Aoki | K-1 Sanctuary I | Tokyo, Japan | KO | 1 | 0:40 |
| 1992-12-11 | Loss | (Netherlands) Rob Kaman | | Tokyo, Japan | KO | | |
| 1992-10-04 | Loss | (Australia) Stan Longinidis | Seido Kaikan '92 Karate World Cup Kakutogi Olympic III | Japan | TKO (Dislocated shoulder) | 1 | |
Watt was injured when both fighters fell out of the ring.
| 1992-08-29 | Loss | (United States) Mike Vieira | | San Jose, California | KO (Punch) | 2 | 2:05 |
Fight was for the UMT World Cruiserweight title.
| 1992-05-16 | Loss | (Netherlands) Peter Aerts | Rings Mega Battle 4th | Tokyo, Japan | KO | 2 | 2:46 |
| 1992-03-26 | Loss | (Netherlands) Rob Kaman | Seido Kaikan Kakutogi Olympic I | Tokyo, Japan | KO | 2 | 2:18 |
| 1992-03-05 | Draw | (Netherlands) Hans Nyman | Mega Battle II: Ibuki | Amagasaki, Japan | Decision draw | 5 | 3:00 |
Legend: Win Loss Draw/No contest Notes

== See also ==
- List of male kickboxers
