= Boxing in Australia =

- Country: Australia
- National team: Australia

International competitions
- World Amateur Boxing Championships

Audience records
- Single match: Manny Pacquiao vs. Jeff Horn, 51,052, 2017, Suncorp Stadium

Boxing in Australia refers to the sport of boxing held in Australia.

== History ==
The influential traditional martial arts, olympic wrestling and brazilian jiu-jitsu have shaped MMA in Australia, along with the combat sports of boxing and kickboxing/muay thai.

=== Sanctioning ===
The states and territories of Australia have different sanctioning bodies and rules. Sanctioning bodies include: Combat Sports Authority (NSW) and the Professional Boxing and Combat Sports Board (Victoria).

== Governing body ==
Boxing Australia is the national sporting body that runs amateur boxing in Australia and Australian National Boxing Federation which governs Professional boxing in Australia.

== Tournaments ==
- Boxing at the 1938 British Empire Games
- Boxing at the 1956 Summer Olympics
- Boxing at the 1962 British Empire and Commonwealth Games
- Boxing at the 1982 Commonwealth Games
- 1991 World Amateur Boxing Championships
- Boxing at the 2000 Summer Olympics
- Boxing at the 2006 Commonwealth Games
- 2012 Oceania Boxing Olympic Qualification Tournament

== Current Champions ==
=== Male Champions ===
This table showing the male boxers who have won the Australian professional championship.

Weight class:	Champion:	Reign began:
Light Flyweight	Josh Humberdross	1 January 2021
Flyweight	Title Vacant	
Super Flyweight	Title Vacant	
Bantamweight	Mark Schleibs	1 January 2021
Super Bantamweight	Title Vacant	
Featherweight	Title Vacant	
Super Featherweight	Dana Coolwell	4 December 2021
Lightweight	Harry Garside	6 April 2022
Super Lightweight	Youssef Dib	9 April 2021
Welterweight	Title Vacant	
Light Middleweight	Luke Woods	4 December 2021
Middleweight	Isaac Hardman	1 December 2021
Super Middleweight	Mason Smith	9 December 2022
Light Heavyweight	Leti Leti	10 April 2021
Cruiserweight	Floyd Mason	4 December 2021
Heavyweight	Justis Huni	22 October 2020

=== Female Champions ===
This table showing the female boxers who have won the Australian professional championship.

Weight class:	Champion:	Reign began:
Super Flyweight	Serena Kingdon	9 November 2012
Bantamweight	Sylvia Scharper	3 September 2011
Super Bantamweight	April Adams	22 October 2011
Featherweight	Kori Farr	17 September 2011
Super Featherweight	Lauryn Eagle	17 August 2013
Lightweight	Sabrina Ostowari	10 May 2014
Super Lightweight	Deanha Hobbs	17 August 2013

== See also ==
- List of boxing organisations
- Professional boxing in New Zealand
