= Paul Briggs (boxer) =

Australian boxer

Personal information
- Nickname: Hurricane
- Nationality: Australian
- Born: Paul Briggs; 13 August 1975 (age 51) Christchurch, New Zealand
- Height: 5 ft 11 1/2 in (182 cm)
- Weight: Light Heavyweight

Boxing career
- Reach: 71 in (180 cm)
- Stance: Orthodox

Boxing record
- Total fights: 30
- Wins: 26
- Win by KO: 18
- Losses: 4
- Draws: 0
- No contests: 0

Paul Briggs (born 13 August 1975) is an Australian former boxer. He was a highly ranked contender in the light heavyweight division. He is most known for being knocked out in just 30 seconds into his fight against Danny Green in what bookies and betting agencies called a "one punch fixed fight"

== Biography ==
=== Kickboxing era ===
Paul "Hurricane" Briggs' career began with kick boxing at a young age, turning professional by the age of 15. By the age of 17, Briggs was accomplished enough to challenge Thai kick boxer, Jomhod Sor Chid Lata, for the World Kickboxing Association (WKA) title. Briggs spent the next two years training in Thailand with the very man who defeated him. This training propelled Briggs to the WKA World Championship.

Briggs soon tired of international kickboxing competition. He quit competing and began working as a DJ.

=== Professional boxing ===
In November 1999, Paul Briggs began boxing. Over the course of 5 years, Briggs compiled a 23-1 (17 KO's) record, leading to a WBC No. 1 rating and a WBC Light Heavyweight World Championship fight against Tomasz Adamek, who at the time, had 28 wins and no losses.

==== First fight with Adamek ====
On 21 May 2005 in Chicago Briggs lost to Adamek in a majority decision. The fight was described by some as one of the most brutal in recent memory, as Briggs suffered a large cut above his left eye early in the fight and Adamek bled profusely from his nose for much of the fight, as well. Adamek tended to be the aggressor, though Briggs displayed an excellent defence as well as flashes of power that, at times, staggered Adamek. Both fighters won subsequent tune-up fights and were contracted to a rematch.

==== Rematch with Adamek ====
The rematch took place on 6 October 2006. Adamek came in a heavy favourite. Briggs was coming in with a new trainer, Johnny Lewis. The rematch would be the same as the first fight, action packed and very entertaining. Briggs seemed to be getting outboxed in the first round until he unleashed a heavy left hook to Adamek's jaw which dropped the champion. Adamek managed to get up and continue and survived the round. Again Briggs was cut in the second round. It appeared to be from a punch and it also appeared to be in a bad spot: over his left eye. Johnny Lewis managed to stop the bleeding for most of the fight and the cut was not a major factor. Briggs showed more aggression this time around and made it a very close fight. A case could have been made for either fighter winning. But in the end it came down to another majority decision which Adamek won yet again. Many who watched the fight have stated although Adamek seemed to be the busier of the two, his punches were ineffective and landed mostly on the arms and gloves of Briggs.

==== After Adamek ====
After the second loss to Adamek, Briggs decided against a third match, stating he wanted to go for new opponents:

I'm not hanging them up. I can fight and I am exciting to watch. Jim Lampley and lots of other people are telling me it was the best combined 24 rounds they have ever seen. There are some good things for me over here now (America). I am building a great fan base now, even though I am not winning.

After the fight, Don King said he supported Briggs and wanted to see him back.

==== Retirement ====
After the Adamek fight, Briggs had one more fight, winning a 12-round UD over South African Rupert van Aswegen. Briggs injured his ankle one day before the bout, and fought what he called the worst performance of his career. He was to continue fighting but when back in training, he started having serious problems. He had scans done and it was revealed he had problems with his nervous system. Briggs was thought to have gotten past his problems, and relocated back to the Gold Coast where he began working with a new trainer. He also revealed he was moving down to the super-middleweight division and challenged fellow Australian Anthony Mundine to a fight. A couple of weeks into training however Briggs again had problems, and on the advice of his new trainer, retired from the sport. Briggs is currently located on the Gold Coast, and frequently commentates boxing matches on Fox Sports and Mainevent.

==== Return to the ring ====
On 21 July 2010, Briggs returned to the ring in Perth to take on Danny Green for the IBO cruiserweight title. Before the bout Green labelled Briggs "unprofessional" after the latter weighed in nearly 4 kg over the agreed-upon weight. The ensuing fight was seen as a "farce", with Briggs collapsing after 29 seconds following an innocuous left jab by Green, his second in the fight, which appears to have at most brushed the top of Briggs' head. Briggs was subsequently booed out of the stadium by irate fans, and had to be protected by management from projected missiles being thrown at him. In a post-bout interview Green apologised to fans who had paid to attend. Online bookmaker Centrebet labelled the bout "highly, highly dubious" following a massive betting plunge shortly before the fight. The fight had been due to be held in Sydney but was moved at the last minute after the New South Wales Combat Sports Authority refused to commission the bout claiming Briggs was "unfit" to fight.

The Western Australian Combat Sports Commission later fined Briggs $75,000 and cancelled his registration as a boxer in Western Australia. They found that he had withheld the complete picture of his medical condition. They also passed evidence to the police that the Sword Boys criminal gang had bet $100,000 on a first-round KO. Paul Briggs disputed "100 per cent" the findings of the commission.

== Autobiography ==
During the lead up to the first Adamek fight, Briggs co-authored, with Gregor Salmon, an autobiography Heart, Soul, Fire: The Journey of Paul Briggs (2005), detailing his rise to success as an international kick boxer, his descent into organised crime, drugs and violence, and ultimately his rise back to respectability and dominance in international boxing.

== Professional boxing record ==
30 fights	26 wins	4 losses
By knockout	18	2
By decision	7	2
By disqualification	1	0

No.	Result	Record	Opponent	Type	Round, time	Date	Location	Notes
30	Loss	26–4	(Australia) Danny Green	KO	1 (12), 0:29	21 Jul 2010	Challenge Stadium, Perth, Western Australia	For IBO cruiserweight title
29	Win	26–3	(South Africa) Rupert van Aswegen	UD	12	4 Feb 2007	(Australia) State Sports Centre, Sydney, New South Wales	For vacant IBF Australasian light heavyweight title
28	Loss	25–3	(Poland) Tomasz Adamek	MD	12	7 Oct 2006	(United States) Allstate Arena, Rosemont, Illinois, US	For WBC light heavyweight title
27	Win	25–2	(Argentina) Jose Alberto Clavero	DQ	5 (10), 0:28	16 Jun 2006	(Australia) Sleeman Sports Complex Arena, Chandler, Queensland	Corner refused to continue when ordered to
26	Win	24–2	(United States) Etianne Whitaker	KO	5 (10), 1:56	15 Oct 2005	Mehrzweckhalle Süd, Düsseldorf, Germany	
25	Loss	23–2	(Poland) Tomasz Adamek	MD	12	21 May 2005	(United States) United Center, Chicago, Illinois, US	For vacant WBC light heavyweight title
24	Win	23–1	(Croatia) Stipe Drews	UD	12	15 Aug 2004	(Australia) State Sports Centre, Sydney, New South Wales	WBC Light heavyweight title eliminator.
23	Win	22–1	(Mexico) Jesus Ruiz	UD	12	7 Mar 2004	(Australia) Panthers World of Entertainment, Penrith, New South Wales	
22	Win	21–1	(Argentina) Juan Eduardo Zabala	RTD	5 (10), 3:00	31 Oct 2003	(Australia) Panthers World of Entertainment, Penrith, New South Wales	
21	Win	20–1	(Argentina) Jorge Castro	UD	10	13 Apr 2003	(Australia) Carrara Sports Complex, Carrara, Gold Coast, Queensland	
20	Win	19–1	(United States) Brad McNeil	TKO	1 (8), 2:33	19 Jan 2003	(Australia) Telstra Superdome, Melbourne, Victoria	
19	Win	18–1	(New Zealand) Anthony Bigeni	TKO	1 (10)	6 Dec 2002	(Australia) State Netball & Hockey Centre, Parkville, Victoria	
18	Win	17–1	(Australia) Glen Kelly	TKO	4 (12)	18 Sep 2002	(Australia) Horden Pavilion, Moore Park, New South Wales	Retained OPBF Light Heavyweight Title
17	Win	16–1	(Samoa) Seiaute Ma'ilata	TKO	4 (12)	7 Jun 2002	(Australia) Southport Sharks AFL Club, Southport, Queensland	Retained OPBF Light Heavyweight Title
16	Win	15–1	(Kenya) Kariz Kariuki	TKO	4 (12)	9 May 2002	(Australia) Convention Centre, Melbourne, Victoria	Retained OPBF Light Heavyweight Title
15	Win	14–1	(Australia) Paul Smallman	TKO	4 (12)	4 Mar 2002	(Australia) Jupiters Hotel & Casino, Broadbeach, Queensland	Won vacant OPBF Light Heavyweight Title
14	Win	13–1	(United States) James Green	TKO	3 (4), 2:22	10 Nov 2001	(United States) Bill Graham Civic Auditorium, San Francisco, California	
13	Win	12–1	(Australia) Gurkan Ozkan	PTS	8	8 Sep 2001	(Australia) Movieworld, Gold Coast, Queensland	
12	Win	11–1	(Samoa) Jeff Tupu	TKO	2 (12)	8 Jul 2001	(Australia) Jupiters Hotel & Casino, Broadbeach, Queensland	Retained Australian light heavyweight title
11	Win	10–1	(New Zealand) Sam Leuii	KO	2 (10)	16 Mar 2001	(Australia) Coogee Randwick RSL, Sydney, New South Wales	
10	Win	9–1	(Australia) Shane Dalton	TKO	2 (6)	25 Feb 2001	(Australia) Southport Australian Football Club, Southport, Queensland	
9	Win	8–1	(Australia) Ken Suavine	TKO	2 (10)	23 Feb 2001	(Australia) Coolangatta Hotel, Coolangatta, Queensland	
8	Win	7–1	(Australia) Adrian Bellin	RTD	7 (12), 3:00	24 Nov 2000	(Australia) Knox Netball Centre, Melbourne, Victoria	Won vacant Australian light heavyweight title
7	Win	6–1	(Australia) Tosca Petridis	TKO	1 (10), 1:49	6 Oct 2000	(Australia) Seagulls Rugby League Club, Tweed Heads, New South Wales	
6	Win	5–1	(Australia) Daniel Roswell	TD	5 (12)	28 Jul 2000	(Australia) Seagulls Rugby League Club, Tweed Heads, New South Wales	Won vacant IBF Pan Pacific cruiserweight title
5	Win	4–1	(Australia) Jamie Wallace	TKO	3 (8)	30 Jun 2000	(Australia) Seagulls Rugby League Club, Tweed Heads, New South Wales	
4	Win	3–1	(Fiji) Mosese Sorovi	TKO	7 (10)	5 May 2000	(Australia) Lismore Workers Club, Lismore, New South Wales	
3	Win	2–1	(Australia) Ken Suavine	TKO	4 (8)	29 Nov 1999	(Australia) Southport RSL, Southport, Queensland	
2	Loss	1–1	(Australia) Larl Zada	KO	3 (10)	4 Jan 1997	(Australia) Brisbane Convention Centre, Brisbane, Queensland	
1	Win	1–0	(Australia) Ronald Doo	MD	10	19 Jun 1994	(Australia) Stafford Tavern, Brisbane, Queensland	

== Partial Kickboxing record ==
Professional kickboxing record
The accurate record is unknown.
Date	Result	Opponent	Event	Location	Method	Round	Time
1999-12-24	Win	(Japan) Noboru Uchida	MAJKF "Tornado Warning -The Invasion of Tornado!!-」	Japan	TKO(Second stoppage)	4	0:00
1996	Loss	(France) Stéphane Nikiéma	Conrad Jupiters Cup, Gold Coast	Australia	KO (Knee)	1	
1993-12-05	Win	(Japan) Taiei Kin	Revenge	Melbourne, Australia	KO (Right knee)	1	2:55
1994-03-26	Loss	(Thailand) Jom Hod Sor Chid Lata	Festival Hall, Brisbane	Australia	KO (Left low kick)	2	
The bout was for Jomhod's World Title. Just before this bout, Briggs's kickboxing record had been announced as 35 Fights 32 Wins 1o KOs 3 Losses
Legend: Win Loss Draw/No contest Notes

== Bibliography ==
- Briggs, Paul; Salmon, Gregor (2005). Heart, Soul, Fire: The Journey of Paul Briggs. Sydney, NSW: HarperCollins. ISBN 0-7322-8190-3.
