= Paul Murdoch =

Australian boxer (born 1973)

Personal information
- Nationality: Australian
- Born: 3 October 1973 (age 52) Geelong, Victoria, Australia
- Height: 6 ft 1 in (185 cm)
- Weight: Light-heavyweight; Cruiserweight

Boxing career
- Reach: 74 in (188 cm)
- Stance: Orthodox

Boxing record
- Total fights: 34
- Wins: 26
- Win by KO: 16
- Losses: 7
- Draws: 1

Paul Murdoch (born 3 October 1973) is an Australian former professional boxer who competed from 1998 to 2007. He held the PABA light-heavyweight title twice between 2001 and 2007 and challenged for the WBO and light-heavyweight title in 2006.

== Professional career ==
=== Murdoch vs. Erdei ===
On 5 May 2006, Murdoch challenged Zsolt Erdei for the WBO and lineal light-heavyweight titles in Düsseldorf, Germany. Erdei dominated the bout, knocking Murdoch down in the eight round before winning in the tenth round by TKO.

=== Murdoch vs. Green ===
On 21 January 2007, Murdoch challenged Danny Green in an unification bout, for Murdoch's PABA light-heavyweight title and Green's IBF Pan Pacific light-heavyweight title. After Green knocked Murdoch down in both the first and second round, Murdoch's corner threw in the towel. After the loss, Murdoch retired from boxing with excellent career stats, finishing with a record of 26 wins (16 KOs), 7 losses, and 1 draw.

== Professional boxing record ==
34 fights	26 wins	7 losses
By knockout	16	3
By decision	10	4
Draws	1	

No.	Result	Record	Opponent	Type	Round, time	Date	Location	Notes
34	Loss	26–7–1	Danny Green	TKO	2 (12), 1:05	21 Jan 2007	State Netball and Hockey Centre, Parkville, Australia	Lost PABA light-heavyweight title; For IBF Pan Pacific light-heavyweight title
33	Win	26–6–1	Walter Pupu'a	UD	12	9 Dec 2006	Geelong Arena, North Geelong, Australia	Retained PABA light-heavyweight title
32	Loss	25–6–1	Zsolt Erdei	TKO	10 (12), 0:19	6 May 2006	Burg-Wächter Castello, Düsseldorf, Germany	For WBO light heavyweight title
31	Win	25–5–1	Birbal Junior	KO	2 (12), 0:16	26 Mar 2006	Ellerslie Racecourse, Auckland, New Zealand	Retained PABA light-heavyweight title
30	Win	24–5–1	James Ellis	TKO	3 (8), 0:21	29 Jul 2005	Knox Netball Centre, Ferntree Gully, Australia	
29	Win	23–5–1	Sakeasi Dakua	TKO	4 (12)	17 May 2005	Tianhe Stadium, Guangzhou, China	Retained PABA light-heavyweight title
28	Win	22–5–1	John Wyborn	UD	12	12 Nov 2004	Knox Netball Centre, Ferntree Gully, Australia	Retained PABA light-heavyweight title
27	Win	21–5–1	Sitiuni Naea	TKO	3 (12)	30 May 2004	North Harbour Rugby League Club, Auckland, New Zealand	Retained PABA light-heavyweight title
26	Win	20–5–1	Timo Masua	KO	3 (12)	21 Nov 2003	Knox Netball Centre, Ferntree Gully, Australia	Retained PABA light-heavyweight title
25	Win	19–5–1	Colin Hunia	TKO	6 (12)	25 Oct 2003	Kingsgate Hotel, Auckland, New Zealand	Retained PABA light-heavyweight title
24	Win	18–5–1	Stewart Moller	UD	12	25 Jul 2003	Knox Netball Centre, Ferntree Gully, Australia	Retained PABA light-heavyweight title
23	Win	17–5–1	Steve Wood	TKO	1 (12)	22 Feb 2003	Northland College Hall, Kaikohe, New Zealand	Won vacant PABA light-heavyweight title
22	Loss	16–5–1	Tosca Petridis	SD	10	6 Dec 2002	State Netball and Hockey Centre, Parkville, Australia	
21	Win	16–4–1	Lightning Lupe	KO	2 (12)	1 Sep 2002	Sheepy's Bar, Papatoetoe, New Zealand	Retained PABA light-heavyweight title
20	Win	15–4–1	Sam Leuii	TKO	4 (12)	9 May 2002	Ocean City Restaurant, Auckland, New Zealand	Retained PABA light-heavyweight title
19	Win	14–4–1	Frank Faalenuu	TKO	6 (12)	24 Feb 2002	Alexandra Park Raceway, Auckland, New Zealand	Retained PABA light-heavyweight title
18	Win	13–4–1	Viliamu Lesiva	TKO	6 (12)	2 Dec 2001	Alexandra Park Raceway, Auckland, New Zealand	Retained PABA light-heavyweight title
17	Win	12–4–1	Anthony Bigeni	TKO	9 (12)	2 Sep 2001	Sky City Casino, Auckland, New Zealand	Won PABA light-heavyweight title
16	Loss	11–4–1	Anthony Bigeni	PTS	12	8 Jun 2001	WestpacTrust Centre, Christchurch, New Zealand	
15	Win	11–3–1	Paul Ponting	KO	5 (8)	23 Jan 2001	Geelong, Australia	
14	Loss	10–3–1	Daniel Rowsell	TKO	9 (12)	24 Nov 2000	Knox Netball Centre, Ferntree Gully, Australia	For vacant Australian cruiserweight title
13	Win	10–2–1	Scott Parker	KO	2	20 Oct 2000	Corio Leisure Centre, Geelong, Australia	
12	Win	9–2–1	Gavin Ryan	PTS	10	18 Aug 2000	Knox Netball Centre, Ferntree Gully, Australia	
11	Win	8–2–1	Lawrence Tauasa	PTS	8	21 Jul 2000	Hornsby RSL Club, Sydney, Australia	
10	Win	7–2–1	Jamie Wallace	PTS	10	5 May 2000	Knox Netball Centre, Ferntree Gully, Australia	
9	Loss	6–2–1	Daniel Rowsell	PTS	8	11 Feb 2000	Beaton Park Stadium, Wollongong, Australia	
8	Win	6–1–1	Louis van Winkel	UD	6	11 Dec 1999	Geelong Arena, North Geelong, Australia	
7	Win	5–1–1	Brown Enyi	KO	1 (6)	22 Nov 1999	Hurstville Civic Centre, Sydney, Australia	
6	Loss	4–1–1	Peter Manesis	PTS	8	30 Oct 1999	Croydon Leisure Centre, Croydon, Australia	
5	Win	4–0–1	Costa Chondros	KO	3	10 Sep 1999	Knox Netball Centre, Ferntree Gully, Australia	
4	Win	3–0–1	Matt Trihey	PTS	6	23 Apr 1999	Dallas Brooks Hall, East Melbourne, Australia	
3	Win	2–0–1	Benny Horra	PTS	6	23 Oct 1998	Town Hall, Moorabbin, Australia	
2	Draw	1–0–1	Jamie Myer	PTS	6	2 Oct 1998	Sports and Fitness Centre, Werribee, Australia	
1	Win	1–0	Stewart Moller	PTS	6	27 Mar 1998	Corio Leisure Centre, Geelong, Australia	

Sporting positions
Regional boxing titles
Preceded by Anthony Bigeni	PABA light-heavyweight champion 2 September 2001 – 6 December 2002; Vacant after loss to Petridis	Vacant Title next held by Himself
Vacant Title last held by Himself	PABA light-heavyweight champion 22 February 2003 – 21 January 2007	Succeeded by Danny Green
