= Benjamin Kelleher =

Australian combat sports fighter

- Born: Benjamin Karl Kelleher; 18 August 1987 (age 39); Auckland, New Zealand
- Nationality: Australia
- Height: 187.96 cm (6 ft 2 in)
- Weight: 90.1 kg (199 lb; 14 st 3 lb)
- Division: Heavyweight (Boxing); Cruiserweight (Boxing); Super Cruiserweight (Kickboxing); Cruiserweight (Kickboxing); Light Heavyweight (MMA); Middleweight (MMA)

Professional boxing record
- Total: 22
- Wins: 15
- By knockout: 4
- Losses: 5
- By knockout: 3
- Draws: 2

Mixed martial arts record
- Total: 24
- Wins: 13
- By knockout: 5
- By submission: 4
- By decision: 4
- Losses: 11
- By knockout: 4
- By submission: 5
- By decision: 2
- Draws: 0

Amateur record
- Total: 4
- Wins: 1
- By submission: 1
- Losses: 3
- By submission: 1

Other information
- Boxing record from BoxRec
- Mixed martial arts record from Sherdog

Benjamin Karl Kelleher (born Auckland New Zealand 18 August 1987) is a New Zealand-born Australian combat sports fighter where he competes in professional boxing, MMA fighting, kickboxing and Muay Thai boxing.

Kelleher has fought over 80 times across all sports codes. In boxing, some of his most notable wins including winning the Australian National title against Jayden Joseph and the IBF Pan Pacific regional title against Patrick Ferguson.

== Kickboxing ==
On 27 April 2013, Kelleher fought Ray Dimachki for the WKN Australian super cruiserweight title under K1 rules. Kelleher won the fight by Majority Decision. On 2 August 2014, Kelleher fought New Zealander Ramegus Te Wake for the WKBF South Pacific Cruiserweight title. Kelleher won the fight by knockout. In November 2014, Kelleher took on Chris Birch. Kelleher won the fight by unanimous decision. Kelleher retired from kickboxing after snapping his tibia and fibula, however, after two years from kickboxing, he returned to win a fight against Aaron Grigolon by unanimous decision in 2016.

=== Kickboxing titles ===
- WKBF South Pacific Cruiserweight title
- WKN Australian super cruiserweight title

== MMA ==
On 15 September 2012, Kelleher fought for Australian MMA Middleweight title. Originally the fight was booked against Vik Grujic, however, it was later changed to Leon Johns. Kelleher won the fight by TKO. On 12 July 2013, Kelleher took on Daniel Way. At this point Kelleher was on a five fight winning streak across Kickboxing and MMA. Kelleher lost the fight by Split Decision. On 17 May 2014, Kelleher took on Dan Kelly for the AFC title. The winner would also get a possible fight with UFC in the future. Kelleher lost the fight by Submission.

=== MMA titles ===
- Australian National Middleweight title

== Boxing ==
In December 2016, as well as being Anthony Mundine sparring partner while Mundine prepares for his fight against Danny Green, Kelleher also fought Daniel Russell on 3 December. The fight ended in a Split Decision draw. On 7 November 2017, Kelleher was scheduled to fight Brett Petters in a rematch, after their original fight ended in a draw on 18 March. Unfortunately the fight did not happen. On 13 December 2017, Kelleher was scheduled to fight Daniel Russell in a rematch on the Jeff Horn world title defence undercard. Unfortunately this fight did not happen.

After a successful win over New Zealander Nikolas Charalampous for the ANBF Australasian title, Kelleher fought Jai Opetaia for the first time in January 2018 for the Australian National Cruiserweight title. Kelleher lost the fight by TKO stoppage in the third round. After a successful win over Robert Ferguson, Kelleher took on Jayden Joseph for his second attempt at the Australian National Cruiserweight title in July 2018. Kelleher won the fight by unanimous decision with judges scoring judges 97–94, 97–93, and 99–91. Kelleher went on to defeat kickboxer Brad Traynor in a boxing fight. In September 2018, Kelleher was sparring with famous Rugby star Quade Cooper in hopes that Quade Cooper would fight on the Jeff Horn vs Anothony Mundine undercard, However, Cooper did not fight in the end.

After his successful Australian title defence against Uria Afamasaga, in the biggest fight of his career, Keheller fought American Patrick Ferguson for the vacant IBF Pan Pacific Cruiserweight title. Kelleher won the fight the fight by Unanimous decision, winning his first major regional title. Kelleher went to fight Quintin Carey. Kelleher won the fight by unanimous decision.

In November 2019, Kelleher sparred with Barry Hall to prepare for Halls fight against Paul Gallen. Due to the COVID-19 Pandemic, Kelleher was not able to secure a fight until October 2020. Kelleher was originally scheduled to fight David Light in August 2020, however due to the Pandemic in New Zealand, the fight was called off. In the second time of his career, Kelleher took on Jai Opetaia but this time for the WBO Global and IBF Asia Oceania Cruiserweight titles. Kelleher lost the fight by TKO in the sixth round. After a win over Waikato Falefehi, Kelleher took on former world title challenger to try capture the Australian National Cruiserweight title for the second time of his career. Kelleher lost the fight by fifth-round TKO.

On the 19th of March 2022, Kelleher took on New Zealand-born Australian Peter Sa'lesui. Sa'lesui won the fight by Majority Decision. The two fought again on the 7th of May 2022, but this time for the vacant IBO Oceania-Orient Cruiserweight title. Sa'lesui won the rematch by Split Decision.

=== Boxing titles ===
- Universal Boxing Organisation
  - UBO Asia Pacific Cruiserweight title
- Australian National Boxing Federation
  - Australasian Cruiserweight title
  - Australian National Cruiserweight title
- International Boxing Federation
  - IBF Pan Pacific Cruiserweight title

=== Professional boxing record ===
22 fights	15 wins	5 losses
By knockout	4	3
By decision	11	2
Draws	2	

No.	Result	Record	Opponent	Type	Round, time	Date	Location	Notes
22	Lose	15–5–2	(Australia) Peter Sa'lesui	SD	8	7 May 2022	Royal International Convention Centre, Bowen Hills, Queensland, Australia	Lost vacant IBO Oceania-Orient Cruiserweight title
21	Lose	15–4–2	(Australia) Peter Sa'lesui	MD	8	19 March 2022	Melbourne Sports and Aquatic Centre, Albert Park, Victoria, Australia	
20	Win	15–3–2	(Australia) Waikato Falefehi	UD	5	4 September 2021	Eatons Hill Hotel, Eatons Hill, Queensland, Australia	
19	Lose	14–3–2	(Australia) Mark Flanagan	TKO	5 (10), 2:45	26 June 2021	Entertainment Centre, Townsville, Queensland, Australia	Lost vacant Australian National Cruiserweight title
18	Win	14–2–2	(Australia) Waikato Falefehi	UD	6	5 March 2021	Eatons Hill Hotel, Eatons Hill, Queensland, Australia	
17	Lose	13–2–2	(Australia) Jai Opetaia	TKO	6 (10), 1:50	22 October 2020	Fortitude Music Hall, Fortitude Valley, Queensland, Australia	Lost WBO Global & IBF Asia Cruiserweight titles
16	Win	13–1–2	(Australia) Quintin Carey	UD	6	21 September 2019	Southport Sharks AFL Club, Southport, Queensland, Australia	
15	Win	12–1–2	(United States) Patrick Ferguson	UD	10	8 June 2019	The Star Gold Coast, Broadbeach, Queensland, Australia	Won vacant IBF Pan Pacific Cruiserweight title
14	Win	11–1–2	(Australia) Uria Afamasaga	UD	10	16 March 2019	Southport Sharks AFL Club, Southport, Queensland, Australia	Defended Australian National Cruiserweight title
13	Win	10–1–2	(Australia) Brad Traynor	UD	4	4 August 2018	The Melbourne Pavilion, Flemington, Victoria, Australia	
12	Win	9–1–2	(Australia) Jayden Joseph	UD	10	7 July 2018	Mansfield Tavern, Mansfield, Queensland, Australia	Won Australian National Cruiserweight title
11	Win	8–1–2	(Australia) Robert Ferguson	UD	4	21 April 2018	Ipswich Basketball Stadium, Ipswich, Queensland, Australia	
10	Lose	7–1–2	(Australia) Jai Opetaia	TKO	3 (10), 2:36	17 January 2018	The Star Sydney, Pyrmont, New South Wales, Australia	Lost Australian National cruiserweight title
9	Win	7–0–2	(New Zealand) Nikolas Charalampous	UD	10	2 December 2017	Mansfield Tavern, Mansfield, Queensland, Australia	
8	Win	6–0–2	(Australia) Chris McClung	TKO	2 (4), 0:52	6 October 2017	The Melbourne Pavilion, Flemington, Victoria, Australia	
7	Win	5–0–2	(New Zealand) Filipo Fonoti Masoe	UD	5	23 September 2017	Eatons Hill Hotel, Eatons Hill, Queensland, Australia	
6	Win	4–0–2	(Malaysia) Stephen Anak	TKO	5 (8), 2:59	27 May 2017	Resorts World Sentosa, Singapore	Defended UBO Asia Pacific Cruiserweight title
5	Draw	3–0–2	(Australia) Brett Peters	MD	4	18 March 2017	Eatons Hill Hotel.Eatons Hill, Queensland, Australia	
4	Win	3–0–1	(Indonesia) Satria Antasena	KO	3 (8),	17 February 2017	Foochow Building, Singapore	Won vacant UBO Asia Pacific Cruiserweight title
3	Draw	2–0–1	(Australia) Daniel Russell	SD	5	3 December 2016	Mansfield Tavern, Mansfield, Queensland, Australia	
2	Win	2–0	(Australia) Adam Lovelock	UD	6	1 October 2016	The Met, Fortitude Valley, Queensland, Australia	
1	Win	1–0	(New Zealand) Filipo Fonoti Masoe	TKO	4 (4)	13 August 2016	Pakuranga Rugby Club, South Auckland, New Zealand	

== Mixed martial arts record ==
Professional record breakdown
24 matches	13 wins	11 losses
By knockout	5	4
By submission	4	5
By decision	4	2
Draws	0	
No contests	0	

Ben Kelleher mixed martial arts record
Res.	Record	Opponent	Method	Event	Date	Round	Time	Location	Notes
Loss	13–11	Jimmy Crute	Submission (Arm-Triangle Choke)	HFS – Hex Fight Series 9	23 June 2017	1	1:23		
Win	13–10	Jeff King	Submission (Rear-Naked Choke)	Nitro 14 – Reloaded	10 June 2017	2	4:59		
Loss	12–10	Steve Kennedy	Submission (Arm-Triangle Choke)	Sledgehammer Promotions – Legend MMA 1	28 January 2017	2	2:34		
Loss	12–9	Stuart Dare	TKO (Punches)	HFS 6 – Ebersole vs. Kennedy	24 June 2016	1	0:23		
Loss	12–8	Jimmy Crute	Submission (Armbar)	HFS – Hex Fight Series 5	20 February 2016	1	4:00		
Loss	12–7	Hale Vaa'sa	TKO (Doctor Stoppage)	Nitro MMA – Nitro 13	21 March 2015	1	0:46		
Loss	12–6	Jae Young Kim	TKO (Injury)	Top FC 2 – Top Fighting Championship 2	30 May 2014	1	0:23		
Loss	12–5	Daniel Kelly	Submission (Rear-Naked Choke)	AFC 9 – Australian Fighting Championship 9	17 May 2014	2	3:41		
Win	12–4	Charlie Peato	Decision (Unanimous)	A&K – Alive & Kicking 5	23 March 2014	3	5:00		
Win	11–4	Leon Fuller	Submission (Strikes)	KOTCA – King of the Cage Australia 3	26 October 2013	1	1:95		
Loss	10–4	Rob Wilkinson	Decision (Unanimous)	Submission 4 – Submission Fight Night	17 August 2013	3	5:00		
Loss	10–3	Daniel Way	Decision (Split)	King of the Ring – Rumble Under the Stars	12 July 2013	3	5:00		
Win	10–2	Marko Lukacic	Decision (Unanimous)	Shamrock Events – Night of Mayhem 7	22 June 2013	3	5:00		
Win	9–2	Erinn Mason	Submission (Armbar)	KOTR – King of the Ring 27	23 March 2013	1	1:40		
Win	8–2	Pavel PK	Decision (Unanimous)	SS – Summer Survival	23 February 2013	3	5:00		
Win	7–2	Leon Johns	TKO (Punches)	Shamrock Events – Night of Mayhem 5	15 September 2012	1	1:22		
Win	6–2	Marko Lukacic	Decision (Unanimous)	NOM – Australia vs Croatia	22 June 2012	3	5:00		
Win	5–2	Chris Indich	TKO (Punches)	KOTCA – King of the Cage Australia 2	18 May 2012	1	3:26		
Win	4–2	T.J. Masters	TKO (Punches)	The Cage 2 – USA vs. New Zealand	2 December 2011	3	2:41		
Loss	3–2	Hale Vaa'sa	Submission (Rear-Naked Choke)	King of the Door – Submission 2	26 August 2011	1	—		
Win	3–1	Piotr Clements	KO (Punches)	WKA – Fight Night	18 June 2011	1	2:25		
Win	2–1	Hale Vaa'sa	KO (Punches)	Submission 2011 – Australia vs New Zealand	16 April 2011	1	0:00		
Win	1–1	Richie Cooper	Submission (Keylock)	Submission 2011 – Australia vs New Zealand	16 April 2011	1	0:00		
Loss	0–1	Forrest Goodwin	TKO (Punches)	SCF – Supremacy Cage Fighting 5	24 April 2010	1	1:25		
