= Tosca Petridis =

Australian boxer (born 1966)

- Born: Anastasios Petridis; Melbourne, Australia
- Nationality: Greece; Australia
- Division: Heavyweight, Light Heavyweight, Cruiserweight, Super Middleweight.
- Style: Kickboxing; Boxing, MMA

Tosca Petridis (born Tasis Petridis, 30 October 1966) is an Australian former kickboxer and boxer. He was born in Melbourne, however is of Greek ethnicity. He lives in Melbourne.

== Kickboxing ==
Tosca is a former 7 time World Kickboxing champion.

In 1992, Tosca won his first World Kickboxing Title, winning the WKA/ISKA World Light Heavyweight Championship against American Mike Cole in Melbourne.

In 1993, Petridis beat the legendary Jean-Yves Thériault, by points decision in a 12-round fight in Montreal, Quebec, Canada, for Thériault's world Kickboxing title, under American Kickboxing rules. Tosca in 1993, also competed in the K-2 Grand Prix '93 tournament, which was a Light Heavyweight tournament hosted by K-1. In this tournament, he beat 1991 World Karate Cup champion Toshiyuki Atokawa in the quarter-finals by unanimous points decision, before losing on a very close points decision in the semi-final to Muay Thai legend, Changpuek Kiatsongrit.

In 1995, Tosca fought Dutch legend, Rob Kaman under Muay Thai rules, and after Tosca seemingly being in front on points against Kaman, the fight was stopped towards the end, after an accidental headbutt, which had the fight ruled a no contest.

== Boxing ==
Tosca also fought a few times in boxing, later in his career, where he became the Australian Cruiserweight boxing champion. In his second boxing bout, he beat former 3 time world Boxing champion Iran Barkley. His overall boxing record was 9 wins, 5 losses, and 1 draw.

== Mixed martial arts ==
Tosca also competed in one MMA match in 2004, where he defeated Judo practitioner, Peter Jones by TKO.

== Titles ==
- 2004 Australia Cruiserweight Title in Perth, Australia
- 1999 PABA Cruiserweight Title in Melbourne, Australia
- 1999 Australia Cruiserweight Title in Melbourne, Australia
- 1993 P.K.C. Full Contact Super Middleweight World title.

== Professional boxing record ==
9 Wins (5 knockouts, 4 decisions), 5 Losses (3 knockouts, 2 decisions), 1 Draw
Result	Record	Opponent	Type	Round	Date	Location	Notes
Win	8–1–2	Brett Smith	TKO	5	7 March 2004	Panthers World of Entertainment, Penrith, New South Wales	Australia Cruiserweight Title.Referee stopped the bout at 2:23 of the fifth round.
Draw	8–1–1	Brett Smith	TD	2	13 November 2003	Albert Park Powerhouse, Albert Park, Victoria	Australia Cruiserweight Title.
Loss	11–3–1	Lawrence Tauasa	MD	12	21 February 2003	Panthers World of Entertainment, Penrith, New South Wales	Australia Cruiserweight Title.
Win	16–4–1	Paul Murdoch	SD	10	6 December 2002	State Netball and Hockey Centre, Parkville, Victoria	
Win	0–2	Kingsley Enedehge	TKO	1	9 May 2002	Melbourne Convention and Exhibition Centre, Melbourne	
Loss	5–1	Paul Briggs	TKO	1	6 October 2000	Seagulls Stadium, Tweed Heads, New South Wales	Referee stopped the bout at 1:49 of the first round.
Loss	12–2	Adam Watt	TKO	7	24 March 2000	Waitara Oval, Sydney	OPBF/Australia Cruiserweight Titles. Referee stopped the bout at 2:36 of the seventh round.
Win	10–9–1	John Wyborn	TKO	1	14 October 1999	Windsor Hotel, Melbourne	PABA Cruiserweight Title.
Loss	7–0	Wayne Braithwaite	TKO	2	29 July 1999	Melbourne Town Hall, Melbourne	WBC International Cruiserweight Title.
Win	12–2–1	Adrian Bellin	TKO	12	23 April 1999	Dallas Brooks Hall, Melbourne	Australia Cruiserweight Title.
Win	7–3–1	James Grima	UD	8	17 July 1998	Melbourne Sports and Aquatic Centre, Melbourne	
Loss	12–0	Chris Okoh	PTS	12	6 November 1996	Hull, Yorkshire	Commonwealth Cruiserweight Title.
Win	9–3–1	Phil Gregory	PTS	10	9 March 1996	Melbourne Park, Melbourne	
Win	33–10	Iran Barkley	UD	10	14 May 1995	The Glasshouse, Melbourne	
Win	4–4–1	Colin Weetra	KO	2	19 June 1994	The Glasshouse, Melbourne	Weetra knocked out at 0:58 of the second round.

== Kickboxing record (incomplete) ==
Kickboxing record
Date	Result	Opponent	Event	Location	Method	Round	Time
1998-09-27	Loss	(Netherlands) Ernesto Hoost	K-1 World Grand Prix '98 opening round	Osaka, Japan	TKO (Corner stoppage)	4	3:00
1995-06-24	No Contest	(Netherlands) Rob Kaman		Paris, France	No Contest		
1995-01-07	Loss	(Netherlands) Rob Kaman	K-2 France Grand Prix '95 Semi-finals	Paris, France	Decision	3	3:00
1993-09-04	Loss	(Netherlands) Ernesto Hoost	K-1 Illusion	Tokyo, Japan	TKO (Ref stop/right punch, 3 knockdowns)	3	0:45
1993-12-19	Loss	(Thailand) Changpuek Kiatsongrit	K-2 Grand Prix '93 Semi-final	Tokyo, Japan	Decision (Unanimous)	3	3:00
1993-12-19	Won	(Japan) Toshiyuki Atokawa	K-2 Grand Prix '93 Quarter-final	Tokyo, Japan	Decision (Unanimous)	3	3:00
1993-06-22	Won	(Canada) Jean-Yves Thériault		Montreal, Québec, Canada	Decision (Split)	12	
Wins Thériault's P.K.C. Full Contact Super Middleweight World title.
Legend: Win Loss Draw/No contest Notes

== Mixed Martial Arts record ==
1 wins (1 knockout)
Result	Record	Opponent	Type	Round	Date	Event	Location	Notes
Win		(Australia) Peter Jones	KO	1	20 May 2013	Shooto Australia: NHB 2004	(Australia) CenterMelbourne, Melbourne	Jones knocked out at first round.
