= List of Australian cruiserweight boxing champions =

The Australian cruiserweight boxing championship is a title administered by the Australian National Boxing Federation (previously the Australian Boxing Federation) since its inauguration in 1981. The title is currently held by Lochlan Duncombe.

== List of champions ==
^{r} – Champion relinquished title.
^{s} – Champion stripped of title.

No.	Champion	Nat.	Reign Began	Reign Ended	Title defenses	Notes	Source(s)
1	Tony Mundine def. Steve Aczel	(Australia)	24 July 1981	March, 1984^{r}	-	Retired in March, 1984	
2	Kevin Wagstaff def. Wally Carr	(England)	1 June 1984	????	def. Roy Bijkerk on 18 November 1985 def. Falu Atti on 10 March 1986	-	
3	Apollo Sweet def. Dave Russell	(Samoa)	3 July 1988	November, 1990^{r}	def. Kevin Wagstaff on 16 November 1988 drw. Daniel Saylor on 17 March 1989 def. Craig Petersen on 16 October 1989 def. Vivian Schwalger on 2 March 1990 drw. Dave Russell on 2 October 1990	Retired in November, 1990	
4	Gary Wills def. Daniel Saylor	(Australia)	13 October 1991	????	def. Bekir Kantarci on 20 June 1992	-	
5	Dave Russell def. Vivian Schwalger	(England)	31 July 1992	????	-	-	
6	Ted Cofie def. Vivian Schwalger	(Ghana)	7 May 1993	23 February 1994	def. Steve Unterholzer on 17 June 1993 def. Moli Kaufusi on 25 September 1993	-	
7	Phil Gregory def. Ted Cofie	(England)	23 February 1994	1 December 1995	def. Steve Unterholzer on 18 August 1994 def. John Connelly on 29 May 1995 drw. Peter Kinsella on 15 August 1995	-	
8	Peter Kinsella def. Phil Gregory	(Australia)	1 December 1995	3 June 1997	-	-	
9	Sam Soliman def. Peter Kinsella	(Australia)	3 June 1997	28 November 1997	-	-	
10	Adrian Bellin def. Sam Soliman	(Australia)	28 November 1997	23 October 1998	def. Peter Kinsella on 27 March 1998 def. Peter Kinsella on 4 July 1998 def. Phil Gregory on 2 October 1998	-	
11	Mosese Sorovi def. Adrian Bellin	(Fiji)	23 October 1998	December, 1998^{r}	-	Moved up to super middleweight by December, 1998	
12	Tosca Petridis def. Adrian Bellin	(Australia)	23 April 1999	24 March 2000	-	-	
13	Adam Watt def. Tosca Petridis	(Australia)	24 March 2000	June, 2000^{r}	-	Competed for Commonwealth Cruiser Title in June and World Cruiser Title in October, 2000	
14	Daniel Rowsell def. Paul Murdoch	(Australia)	24 November 2000	September, 2001^{r}	def. Paul Smallman on 2 March 2001 def. Lawrence Tauasa on 13 July 2001	Competed for PABA Cruiser Title in September, 2001	
15	Jamie Wallace def. Justin Clements	(Australia)	19 July 2002	6 December 2002	-	-	
16	Simon Paterson def. Jamie Wallace	(Australia)	6 December 2002	February, 2002^{r}	-	Competed for IBF Pan Pacific Cruiser Title in February 2002	
17	Lawrence Tauasa def. Tosca Petridis	(Samoa)	21 February 2003	January, 2004^{r}	def. Jamie Wallace on 18 July 2003	Moved up to super middleweight by January, 2004	
18	Tosca Petridis def. Brett Smith	(Australia)	7 March 2004	7 March 2004^{r}	-	Retired after winning title on 7 March 2004	
19	Daniel Ammann def. Justin Clements	(Australia)	29 July 2006	13 May 2011	def. Dominic Vea on 3 November 2006 def. Nermin Sabanovic on 2 March 2007 def. Anthony McCracken on 31 August 2007 def. Brett Smith on 29 February 2008	-	
20	Brad Pitt def. Daniel Ammann	(Australia)	13 May 2011	November, 2011^{r}	-	Competed for OPBF Cruiser Title in November, 2011	
21	Daniel Ammann def. Mostyn Niemann	(Australia)	17 February 2012	24 May 2014	def. Anthony McCracken on 15 June 2012 def. Pieter Cronje on 7 September 2012 def. David Aloua on 30 January 2013 def. Kane Watts on 28 April 2013	-	
22	Mark Flanagan def. Daniel Ammann	(Australia)	24 May 2014	????	def. Shane Quinn on 3 December 2014	-	
23	Kane Watts def. Emosi Solitua	(Australia)	7 August 2015	????	-	-	
24	Aaron Russell def. James Porter	(Australia)	4 June 2016	????	-	-	
25	Danny Green def. Kane Watts	(Australia)	3 August 2016	????	def. Anthony Mundine on 3 February 2017	-	
26	Jai Opetaia def. Daniel Ammann	(Australia)	15 July 2017	????	def. Benjamin Kelleher on 17 January 2018	-	
27	Jayden Joseph def. Uria Afamasaga	(Australia)	27 April 2018	7 July 2018	def. Benjamin Kelleher on 17 January 2018	-	
28	Benjamin Kelleher def. Jayden Joseph	(Australia)	7 July 2018	????	def. Uria Afamasaga on 16 March 2019	-	
29	Daniel Russell def. Jayden Joseph	(Australia)	30 August 2019	14 December 2019	-	-	
30	Jason Whateley def. Daniel Russell	(Australia)	14 December 2019	????	-	-	
31	Luke Modini def. Benjamin Kelleher	(Australia)	9 September 2023	????	-	-	
32	Lochlan Duncombe def. Benjamin Kelleher	(Australia)	17 May 2025	????	-	-	

== See also ==
- List of Australian female boxing champions
- List of Australian heavyweight boxing champions
- List of Australian light heavyweight boxing champions
- List of Australian super middleweight boxing champions
- List of Australian middleweight boxing champions
- List of Australian super welterweight boxing champions
- List of Australian welterweight boxing champions
- List of Australian super lightweight boxing champions
- List of Australian lightweight boxing champions
- List of Australian super featherweight boxing champions
- List of Australian featherweight boxing champions
- List of Australian bantamweight boxing champions
- Boxing in Australia
