= Danny Green (boxer) =

Australian boxer (born 1973)

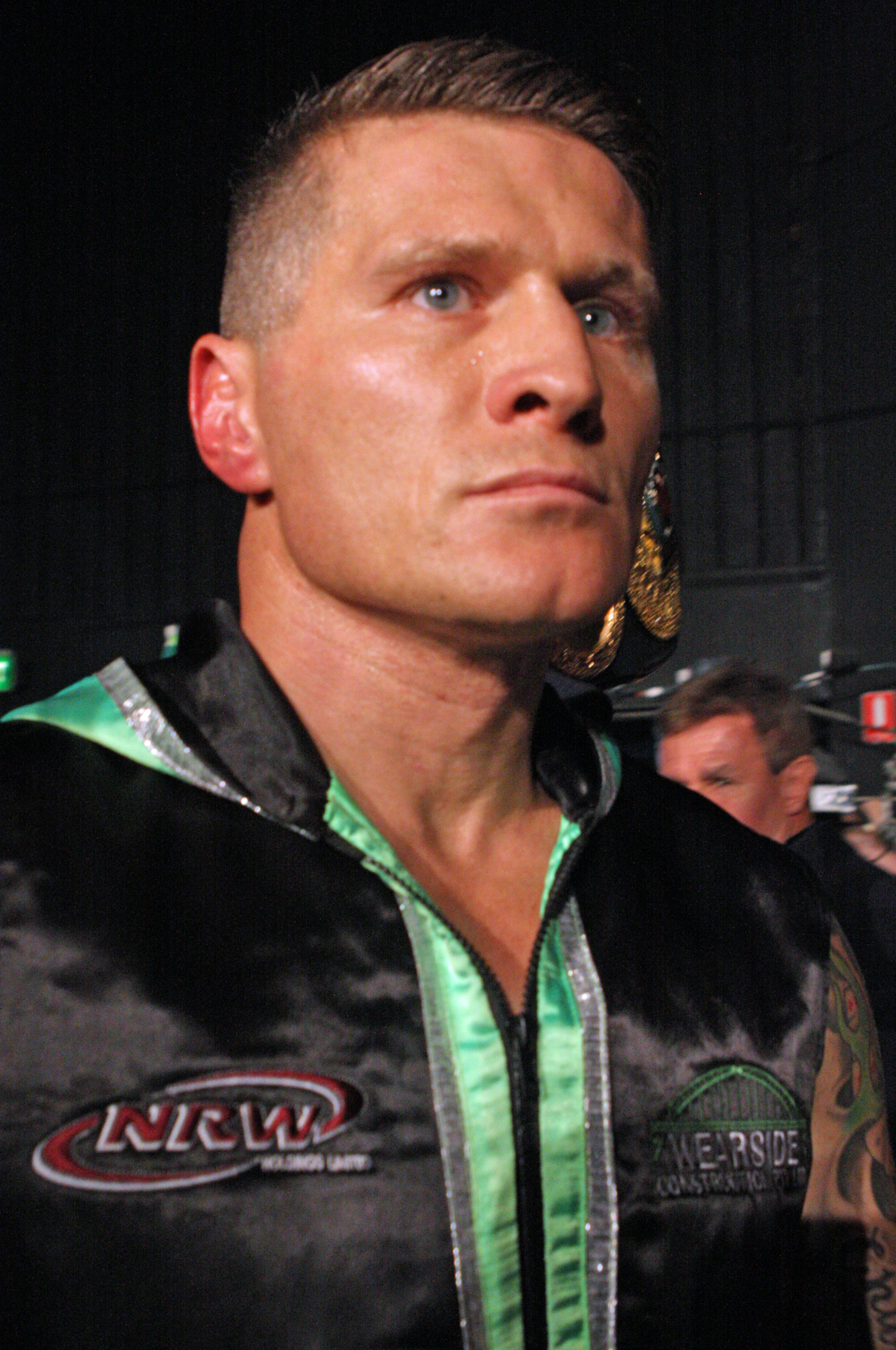
- Green in 2011

Personal information
- Nickname: The Green Machine
- Born: Daniel Thomas Green; 9 March 1973 (age 53) Perth, Western Australia, Australia
- Height: 1.85 m (6 ft 1 in)
- Weight: Super-middleweight; Light-heavyweight; Cruiserweight

Boxing career
- Reach: 185 cm (73 in)
- Stance: Orthodox

Boxing record
- Total fights: 41
- Wins: 36
- Win by KO: 28
- Losses: 5

Daniel Thomas Green (born 9 March 1973) is a former Australian professional boxer. He held the WBA light-heavyweight title from 2007 to 2008, the IBO cruiserweight title twice between 2009 and 2013, and the WBC interim super-middleweight title from 2003 to 2005.

== Amateur career and the Olympics ==
As a kid and teenager Green attended newman college in perth and played on the marist team and had tried martial arts and kickboxing, and had his first amateur boxing bout aged 20.

Green was awarded a scholarship to the Australian Institute of Sport in 1998, and won a bronze medal at the Liverpool International Boxing Tournament in the same year. He was selected for the 1998 Commonwealth Games in Kuala Lumpur, however he broke his hand and was unable to vie for medals.

At the 2000 Australian National titles in Broadbeach, Green lost a "furious contest" against Victorian Nathan Woodham (a boxer he would go on to beat twice in his professional career). In the final Olympic trial in Canberra, Jason DeLisle was eliminated by a Tongan fighter, and Green "tore through the field" to qualify for the boxing at the 2000 Summer Olympics.

Green fought in the 81 kg (179 lb) division at the Olympic Games, and beat the Brazilian Laudelino Barros with a "referee stopped contest" decision in the fourth round of his first bout. In his second bout, Green was defeated by the Russian Alexander Lebziak – also by a "referee stopped contest" decision in the fourth round. Green broke his hand fighting Lebziak (who went on to claim the gold medal in the event). In 2010 Green described Lebziak as his toughest opponent, stating "he was a Russian general in the military, nicknamed 'The Animal' and he had a head impervious to punishment."

"Green finished his amateur career with a record of 35 – 8 (21) and a 16 – 6 international record."

== Professional career ==
Green turned professional at age 28 and has had 33 wins from 38 fights in a professional career that has spanned eleven and a half years. Five of his fights have been outside Australia.

Green has employed the training services of: former world champion Jeff Fenech, Cuban-born Ismael Salas (from mid-2005), and Angelo Hyder (from mid-2009) – whom Green has labelled the "best in the world".

=== Early career ===
Following the 2000 Olympics, Green turned professional under trainer-manager Jeff Fenech, and began training at the Bankstown Police and Community Youth Club from March 2001. Green won his first professional bout by a second-round technical knockout over Waqa Kolivuso in Sydney on 29 June 2001. In a 2008 interview Green stated that his purse for the fight was A$1,200.

Green proceeded to win his first sixteen fights by knockout, eventually earning himself a title fight with Germany's super-middleweight world champion Markus Beyer at the Nürburgring in Germany on 16 August 2003. Green floored Beyer in each of the two opening rounds and was ahead on points when the fight was stopped in the fifth by the American referee Bill Clancy – who judged Green to have intentionally head-butted his opponent. A deep cut above Beyer's right eye meant that he could not continue with the fight, however Green's corner claimed that the cut had been made by an earlier punch. If the cut had been made by an earlier punch, Green would have won on points at the time of stoppage, however "Senior WBC officials Enza Jacoba and Rubin Martinez produced a rule-book for Clancy that stated if an injured boxer was unable to continue because of a cut caused by an intentional head-butt, the offending boxer should be disqualified." Green stated "I should be the champion now but I'm not ... It's a disgrace", however Beyer "derided Green's tactics as unfair". Green's purse for the fight was A$30,000.

Green won an interim WBC super-middleweight title when he defeated Eric Lucas by a sixth-round knockout on 20 December 2003 in Montreal, Quebec, Canada, and then defeated New Zealand fighter Sean Sullivan by a unanimous decision on 21 March 2004 in Perth.

On 29 September 2004 Green survived a second-round knock-down (the first of his professional career) to beat Argentine Omar Eduardo Gonzales in Sydney. In the fifth round, a cut over Gonzales' right eye was ruled too severe to continue, and as Green was ahead on two cards (whilst drawn on the third) he was awarded the win.

Green's performances earned him a re-match with Beyer – who was still the reigning super-middleweight world champion. The second meeting with Beyer occurred at Zwickau in Germany on 12 March 2005. Green knew he was in trouble by the tenth round when Fenech told him "You won't win this fight if you don't knock him out", and came back strongly – knocking Beyer to the canvas for a mandatory eight count in the final round. Despite the late effort, Beyer was awarded a majority points win on two of the three cards, with one judge scoring the bout as a draw. Green praised his opponent after the fight by saying "Markus Beyer was the better man tonight" and "He came back so well since the last time we fought ... that is a sign of a champion." Green's Perth-based manager Wayne Loxley said "We must move forward after tonight's fight, ... We'll offer $2 million to bring Markus Beyer to Perth."

Under new trainer Ismael Salas, Green met American James Crawford for his next fight on 3 July 2005 in Perth. The referee stopped the fight after Crawford had been knocked down three times in the fifth. Immediately following the fight, Green challenged Anthony Mundine, a former rugby league star who had been feuding with Green and his former trainer Jeff Fenech for many years, to step into the ring with him.

On 11 December 2005 Green fought Mexican Kirino Garcia in Perth. Green defeated Garcia with all judges giving Green every round. Kirino was only the second fighter (after Sullivan) to last the distance with Green, and Green said of his opponent "He is a hell of a tough fighter."

=== Green versus Mundine ===
The rivalry between Green and Australian boxer Anthony Mundine dated back to the early 2000s and by 2005 that rivalry had "escalated into a bitter feud". In the lead up to the fight, the boxers held separate media conferences.

As a precursor to their meeting, both boxers had bouts on the same card in Perth on 11 December 2005 (Green defeated Garcia and Mundine stopped Rico Chong Nee in three rounds).

Green and Mundine fought in front of more than 30,000 people on 17 May 2006 at the Sydney Football Stadium. Green started strongly but Mundine grew in confidence and "by round five Green was bloody and visibly tiring." By the end of the twelfth round both boxers were looking for a knockout, however the fight went the distance and Mundine was declared the winner in a unanimous points decision.

Following the fight, Mundine said "I just want to thank Danny for a great fight" and "He put up a good performance, he came ready, came prepared. I was the better man tonight, Dan. Thank you very much." Green told the crowd "To be honest, it was a very difficult fight because ... it's hard to explain – some nights you fight some nights you don't. And I'm not going to take anything away from Choc. I'm not going to say he did this and that, and I didn't do this. Simple as that: I was beaten on the night by a better man tonight."

At the time, the bout was the "most-watched pay-per-view TV event in Australian history", and it is estimated that the fight grossed A$20,000,000. Green earned A$2,500,000 for the fight, and Mundine is believed to have been guaranteed A$3,000,000.

A rematch between the two fighters was described (in 2009) as being "much anticipated", but has failed to eventuate. In March 2009 Mundine stated "I've been there and done that (with Green), so the only thing that is going to inspire me for that fight is the money" and "... all I want is champions. I don't want to be messing around with no contenders." The rivalry continued into 2012 with Green stating: "He won the fight on the night but since then he's avoided the immediate rematch clause" and "Most people in Australia know that that victory is pretty shallow, as far as him fighting a dehydrated, starving ghost" (referring to the considerable weight drop Green undertook for the fight with Mundine).

=== Changing weight class ===
Following his loss to Mundine, Green moved up to the light-heavyweight class to fight fellow Australian Jason DeLisle in Perth on 21 September 2006. Green's performance was described as "dominating" and he unleashed "a vicious combination to finish off DeLisle" by knockout in the ninth round.

On 21 January 2007 Green met Paul Murdoch in a Pan Asian Boxing Association light-heavyweight bout at the State Netball and Hockey Centre in Melbourne. Green floored Murdoch in the first round "with a double left jab and then ended the fight 65 seconds into the second round with a left hook." Following the fight, Green stated "Tonight I think I showed my best is definitely not past me", and regarding a rematch with Mundine, Green said "I'm going to say what I feel and I think the re-match is imminent."

Green had next planned to fight Manny Siaca, however the Puerto Rican was forced to pull out of the match due to a viral infection. Instead, Green fought American Otis Griffin on 18 July 2007 at the Challenge Stadium in Perth. Green produced a convincing performance to win the bout halfway through the third round by knockout. Following the win, "Green immediately challenged IBO light-heavyweight champion Antonio Tarver to put his belt on the line in WA" when he said to the crowd: "Antonio Tarver, here in Perth, Subiaco Oval, 25,000 people – you want to do it Perth?"

=== Green versus Drews ===
On 16 December 2007 Green took on the WBA light-heavyweight champion, Croatian, Stipe Drews at the Challenge Stadium in Perth. Having "prodigious reach", being 1.96 m (6 ft 5 in) tall, and "having lost only one of 33 fights before winning the title against Italian Silvio Branco in April", Drews was considered one of the most awkward boxers in the world.

Green provided a consistently attacking performance and won the bout in a unanimous points decision. The win secured Green the WBA light-heavyweight crown (his second world title) and he celebrated by running into the crowd to embrace his wife (who had been due to give birth to their second child the day before the bout).

=== Retirement and return ===
On 25 March 2008 Green held a press conference in Perth to announce his retirement from boxing. The announcement was made a month away from a planned WBA light-heavyweight title defence against Argentina's Hugo Garay. Green described his decision to hang up his gloves as being like "a premonition, an epiphany", and stated that he struggled with the decision, believing "I am at the top of my game and the peak of my career." Green stated that there was nothing physically wrong with himself, and added "I leave with my dignity and health intact." Anthony Mundine responded to the announcement by saying "It's a smart move on his behalf ... he was a good fighter and a busy fighter but he wasn't a great fighter", and "For me, he is running from the inevitable and it is good that he decided to get out now because he was going to get a whipping again."

During 2008 Green appeared in all ten episodes of the Australian television show Dancing with the Stars (season 8). Green and his dancing partner Natalie Lowe were runners-up after they were defeated by Luke Jacobz and Luda Kroitor in the grand final. Green stated that "he'd had a ball on the show" and said about Jacobz: "I would rather be punching him than dancing against him!"

Green's retirement from boxing ended when he met South African Anthony van Niekerk in Perth for a light-heavyweight bout on 26 April 2009. Green made a positive start to the bout and dropped his opponent in the second round with an "effective combination". Niekerk beat the count, however near the end of the second round Green delivered an overhand right that forced the referee to stop the fight. Speaking from the ring, Green told the crowd "I’m back guys – it was great to be in the ring and my right hand was a potent weapon in there tonight."

=== Green versus Dominguez ===
Green met Argentine Julio Cesar Dominguez for an IBO cruiserweight world title fight in Mississippi, US on 16 August 2009.

A Green right caused the referee to issue Dominguez a standing eight-count during the first round, and Green dominated the fight in a performance described as "patient and clinical" and "dominating". Green knocked Dominguez to the canvas twice in the fifth round – the second of which prompted his corner to throw in the towel as their fighter "lay dazed on the floor".

Green paid tribute to his opponent by stating "This guy was really tough, he needed to be broken down," and to the crowd he said "To the people of Mississippi, thankyou for the hospitality, you’re wonderful people." The win meant that Green had earned three world titles in three weight classes (as of 2009 Jeff Fenech was the only other Australian to have world titles in three different divisions).

=== Green versus Roy Jones Jr. ===
On 2 December 2009 Green placed his IBO cruiserweight title on the line and fought eight-time world champion American Roy Jones Jr. at the Acer Arena in Sydney.

Green dropped Jones with a right punch midway through the first round, and then "pummelled the American legend with a flurry of blows against the ropes" – causing the English referee Howard Foster to halt the contest two minutes and two seconds into the bout. Following the fight, Green said of his opponent: "... that almost most hurt me to do that to someone whom I aspire to look up to as a professional fighter inside and outside the ring" and "He's a bloody legend." Jones told the crowd "We don't make excuses, it was a great performance by Danny."

Controversy followed the fight when Jones demanded that his loss be "overturned to a disqualification victory, citing illegal use of hand wraps." Jones labelled Green a cheater and filed a formal complaint to the NSW Combat Sports Authority (NSWCSA). In the months following the fight, Jones also claimed that the referee stopped the fight too early. In March 2010 Green responded to the allegations with an open letter to Jones, stating "THE hand wraps were the same wraps I used in five previous world title fights, in Germany, Montreal, Australia ..." and "MY hand wraps were personally inspected by three independent inspectors of the NSW Combat Sports Authority and they each certified that my wraps were legal and gave me no advantage whatsoever." The NSWCSA dismissed the matter, however Green claimed that he had "spent tens of thousands of dollars on legal representation and fees in an attempt to protect myself from unsubstantiated claims that should've been ignored from the outset." Green also claimed that the "unnecessary investigation ... ruined his chance to promote a lucrative 'super bout' against the legendary Bernard Hopkins in Sydney" and urged the state premier Kristina Keneally to "launch an investigation into the Combat Sports Authority."

The controversy continued when Jones filed a lawsuit against Green, citing: alleged use of illegal hand wrappings, Green's refusal to invoke a rematch clause in the fight contract, and still being owed money by Green's promotional company, Green Machine Promotions.

=== Green versus Briggs ===
Between the Jones and Briggs fights, Green defended his IBO cruiserweight title when he defeated the Puerto Rican Manny Siaca by a third-round KO in Perth on 14 April 2010.

On 21 July 2010 Green took on Paul Briggs for the IBO cruiserweight world title. The bout had to be moved from Sydney to Perth at the last minute after the New South Wales Combat Sports Authority refused to commission the bout "because of concerns about the medical fitness of 35-year-old Briggs." The concerns were rumoured to be "neurological", however Briggs denied that claim (whilst stating that he did have problems with his sense of balance). Briggs was a two-time light-heavyweight world title contender, however he hadn't fought for three years prior to the bout with Green.

Before the bout Green labelled Briggs "very unprofessional" and "disrespectful" after he weighed-in 3.2 kilograms (7.1 lb) over the agreed-to 84 kilograms (185 lb) fight limit (Green weighed-in at 83.6 kilograms (184 lb)). The cruiserweight weight limit is 90.7 kilograms (200 lb), however boxers are permitted to agree (as happened for the Green-Briggs bout) to meet a weight limit under the cruiserweight maximum. Based on the weight transgression, Green could have called the fight off, however he chose to continue with the bout. Briggs replied to the issue with "I haven't done anything wrong today. I've trained hard, I've come here, I've made weight. Easy as that."

==== Controversy ====
Briggs collapsed 29 seconds into the first round following a left jab by Green – which appeared to have glanced off the top of Briggs' head. The fight was seen as "farcical", and Briggs was booed and showered with beer as he left the stadium.

In a post-bout interview Green said of Briggs "He ain't even a canine" and claimed Briggs wasn't "getting paid a cent" for the fight. Green apologised to the crowd and was reported as stating that he "promised to make it up to his fans with another fight." Online bookmaker Centrebet labelled the bout "highly, highly dubious" following a rush of bets (in the day leading to the fight) that caused a shortening of "odds for a first-round knockout from $5 to odds-on by the time the fight got under way." Briggs responded to the controversy by stating "I didn't take a dive, I've never in my life taken a dive."

The incident received criticism from many boxing experts, with some comparing it to the controversial Bruce Seldon vs. Mike Tyson bout from 1996 and the Western Australian Professional Combat Sports Commission (WAPCSC) launched an enquiry into the fight. Green contributed extensively to the enquiry, and sat with the commission for three hours. The outcome of the WAPCSC investigation labelled the fight a "sham", fined Briggs A$75,000, and cleared Green of any wrongdoing. In March 2012 Briggs stated (via Facebook): "In my appeal against the decision that my fight with Danny Green was fixed and I took a dive (the decision) has been OVERTURNED in a court of law by three High Court judges."

=== Green versus Flores ===
On 17 November 2010 Green met American BJ Flores in Perth to defend his IBO cruiserweight world title. At the time, Flores did not have any world titles, however he was undefeated and formerly boxed as a heavyweight. Green said of his opponent "The most difficult thing about this is not his size, it's his speed coupled with his power and size; not only is he a big unit, he's a fast slick unit." Green entered the ring at 88.6 kilograms (195 lb) which was the heaviest he had fought to that time, however Flores had an 18 centimetres (7.1 in) reach advantage. Flores was described as a "credible opponent", and the bout was seen as a means of answering Green's critics (arising from the Briggs fight).

The contest was described as "hard-fought" and despite being "forced on the back foot for much of the fight", Green won the twelve round bout by a unanimous points decision. Flores handled the Green blows well, and managed to give Green a bloody nose in the eleventh round. Following the fight, Green acknowledged his supporters in the 5000-strong crowd and addressed them by saying "This one's for all of you". The bout was the first loss of Flores' career.

=== Green versus Tarver ===
On 20 July 2011 Green met American Antonio Tarver (nicknamed the "Magic Man") for an IBO cruiserweight title bout at the Entertainment Centre in Sydney. 42-year-old Tarver was a former light-heavyweight world champion, and both he and Green were coming off unanimous-decision victories.

Green was knocked down by a left in round two, and Tarver was the dominant fighter for the first five rounds. Green put up better resistance during rounds six and seven, however Tarver's left-hand punches were "something to behold" in round eight. Following a "flurry of punches at the end of the ninth", Green's corner called the fight and Tarver was awarded a TKO victory. It was the first time Green had been stopped in his professional career.

Green apologised post-fight and said "I couldn't do a thing right". He also acknowledged Tarver by stating "I'm not taking anything away from Antonio. he always said 42 (years of age) was just a number and he showed it tonight." Tarver revealed that Green had hurt him twice during the fight, and stated that a rematch was a possibility. Tarver went on to thank Sydney "for hosting this beautiful fight", and to Green he said "You treated me with dignity and respect."

=== Green versus Włodarczyk ===
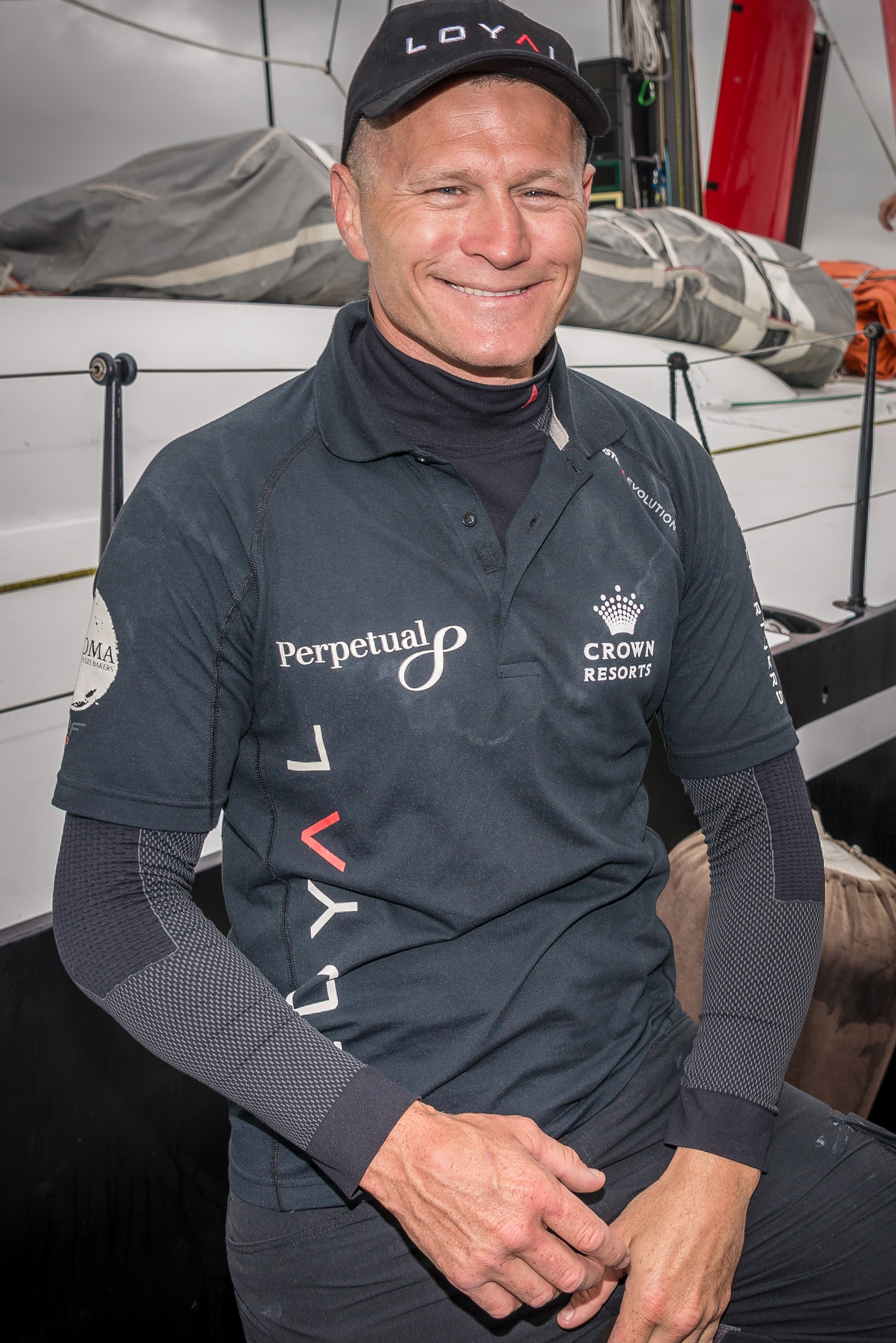
Green on board Perpetual Loyal during the 2014 Sydney–Hobart Race

Green met the Polish fighter Krzysztof Włodarczyk (nicknamed "El Diablo") in Perth on 30 November 2011 for a WBC cruiserweight title bout. Australian boxing trainer Johnny Lewis referred to the bout as "the fight that gives Danny all credibility back", (Lewis believing that Briggs and Drews were inferior opponents for Green).

Green started the fight strongly with commentators estimating that he won the first six rounds – whilst stating that Włodarczyk "didn't appear all that shaken up by the onslaught." Włodarczyk improved in round seven, however the commentators believed Green to be ahead on points by the end of round nine. In round ten one commentator observed that "Green's had his nose busted a bit", and with a minute remaining in the eleventh round, Green was knocked down by "a massive left" from Włodarczyk. Green rose to his feet, however the referee called off the fight to award Włodarczyk a TKO victory.

Green was "highly gracious" in defeat and congratulated his opponent on his win (Włodarczyk's 46th in 49 fights). Whilst in the ring, Green said that he didn't know what the future held, and said of the fight "I took on the best cruiserweight in the world and was four minutes away from a fairytale." Green stated that he was happier with his performance than he had been after the Tarver fight. Włodarczyk admitted that he had started the fight slowly but improved towards the end, and stated "I think I felt less pressure on me boxing away [from home]."

Green held a press conference on 2 December 2011 at which he refused to rule out retirement; stating "Age means nothing, it's up to individuals" and "I would like to walk away saying that I can still beat the best."

=== Later career ===
On 6 June 2012 Green held a press conference to announce that he would fight American Danny Santiago on 25 July 2012 in Perth. Green spent the majority of the press conference discussing Anthony Mundine, and it seemed that Green planned "to drop down to the light-heavyweight division in a bid to coax Mundine into a lucrative rematch." Green stated that "it will be most probably the last time I fight in Western Australia", and said of his opponent "Nothing soft comes out of the Bronx, and he's a very tough guy." Green sent Santiago to the canvas three times before defeating him by a TKO in the fifth round of the July bout. Green remained "tight-lipped on his boxing future" and replied "I'm just going to relax and enjoy it" when asked about his plans.

Green's most recent professional fight was a points win against Shane Cameron in Melbourne on 21 November 2012. The win resulted in Green claiming the IBO world cruiserweight title (which was vacated when Antonio Tarver returned a positive drug test), the fight was first announced at the full cruiserweight limit but a catch weight was soon announced at Dannyweight of 194 pounds. Two weigh in events were held within one day, carefully planned by the Green promotion team to aid in weight draining Cameron and ensuring he was not able to re-hydrate to a decent level. Referee Pat Russell was criticised for his inability and inclination to stop Green using Rabbit punches and excessive holding. Following the fight, Green revealed that he had fought with broken ribs as a result of a training injury received several weeks before the fight. Green conceded about 6 kg (13 lb) to Cameron (the Commonwealth champion), and said of his opponent "I'm proud I did it against a warrior and a much respected athlete."

=== Green versus Mundine II ===
On 3 February 2017, Green and Mundine held a rematch at the Adelaide Oval. In a fight during which both boxers were deducted points, Green was controversially declared the winner by decision.

== Professional boxing record ==
| 48 fights | 43 wins | 5 losses |
|---|---|---|
| By knockout | 35 | 2 |
| By decision | 8 | 2 |
| By disqualification | 0 | 1 |

| No. | Result | Record | Opponent | Type | Round, time | Date | Location | Notes |
|---|---|---|---|---|---|---|---|---|
| 41 | Win | 36–5 | (Australia) Anthony Mundine | MD | 10 | 3 Feb 2017 | Adelaide Oval, Adelaide, Australia | Retained Australian cruiserweight title |
| 40 | Win | 35–5 | (Australia) Kane Watts | UD | 10 | 3 Aug 2016 | Hisense Arena, Melbourne, Australia | Won vacant Australian cruiserweight title |
| 39 | Win | 34–5 | (Argentina) Roberto Bolonti | UD | 10 | 19 Aug 2015 | Hisense Arena, Melbourne, Australia | |
| 38 | Win | 33–5 | (New Zealand) Shane Cameron | UD | 12 | 21 Nov 2012 | Hisense Arena, Melbourne, Australia | Won vacant IBO cruiserweight title |
| 37 | Win | 32–5 | (United States) Danny Santiago | TKO | 5 (10), 2:47 | 25 Jul 2012 | Challenge Stadium, Perth, Western Australia | |
| 36 | Loss | 31–5 | (Poland) Krzysztof Włodarczyk | TKO | 11 (12), 2:15 | 30 Nov 2011 | Challenge Stadium, Perth, Western Australia | For WBC cruiserweight title |
| 35 | Loss | 31–4 | (United States) Antonio Tarver | RTD | 9 (12), 3:00 | 20 Jun 2011 | Entertainment Centre, Sydney, Australia | Lost IBO cruiserweight title |
| 34 | Win | 31–3 | (United States) BJ Flores | UD | 12 | 17 Nov 2010 | Challenge Stadium, Perth, Western Australia | Retained IBO cruiserweight title |
| 33 | Win | 30–3 | (New Zealand) Paul Briggs | KO | 1 (12), 0:29 | 21 Jul 2010 | Challenge Stadium, Perth, Western Australia | Retained IBO cruiserweight title |
| 32 | Win | 29–3 | (Puerto Rico) Manny Siaca | KO | 3 (12), 1:55 | 14 Apr 2010 | Challenge Stadium, Perth, Western Australia | Retained IBO cruiserweight title |
| 31 | Win | 28–3 | (United States) Roy Jones Jr. | TKO | 1 (12), 2:02 | 2 Dec 2009 | Acer Arena, Sydney, Australia | Retained IBO cruiserweight title |
| 30 | Win | 27–3 | (United States) Julio Cesar Dominguez | TKO | 5 (12), 2:53 | 16 Aug 2009 | (United States) Coast Coliseum, Biloxi, Mississippi, US | Won vacant IBO cruiserweight title |
| 29 | Win | 26–3 | (South Africa) Anthony van Niekerk | KO | 2 (10), 2:42 | 26 Apr 2009 | Challenge Stadium, Perth, Western Australia | |
| 28 | Win | 25–3 | (Croatia) Stipe Drews | UD | 12 | 16 Dec 2007 | Challenge Stadium, Perth, Western Australia | Won WBA light-heavyweight title |
| 27 | Win | 24–3 | (United States) Otis Griffin | KO | 3 (12), 1:21 | 18 Jul 2007 | Challenge Stadium, Perth, Western Australia | Retained IBF Pan Pacific and PABA light-heavyweight titles; Won vacant IBO Asia Pacific light-heavyweight title |
| 26 | Win | 23–3 | (Australia) Paul Murdoch | TKO | 2 (12), 1:05 | 21 Jan 2007 | State Netball and Hockey Centre, Melbourne, Australia | Retained IBF Pan Pacific light-heavyweight title; Won PABA light-heavyweight title |
| 25 | Win | 22–3 | (Australia) Jason DeLisle | KO | 9 (12), 1:32 | 21 Sep 2006 | Challenge Stadium, Perth, Western Australia | Won IBF Pan Pacific and vacant PABA interim light-heavyweight titles |
| 24 | Loss | 21–3 | (Australia) Anthony Mundine | UD | 12 | 17 May 2006 | Sydney Football Stadium, Sydney, Australia | |
| 23 | Win | 21–2 | (Mexico) Quirino Garcia | UD | 10 | 11 Dec 2005 | Challenge Stadium, Perth, Western Australia | |
| 22 | Win | 20–2 | (Australia) James Crawford | KO | 5 (10), 2:08 | 3 Jul 2005 | Challenge Stadium, Perth, Western Australia | |
| 21 | Loss | 19–2 | (Germany) Markus Beyer | MD | 12 | 12 Mar 2005 | Stadthalle, Zwickau, Germany | Lost WBC interim super-middleweight title; For WBC super-middleweight title |
| 20 | Win | 19–1 | (Argentina) Omar Gonzalez | TKO | 5 (10) | 24 Sep 2004 | Panthers World of Entertainment, Sydney, Australia | |
| 19 | Win | 18–1 | (New Zealand) Sean Sullivan | UD | 10 | 21 Mar 2004 | Challenge Stadium, Perth, Western Australia | |
| 18 | Win | 17–1 | (Canada) Éric Lucas | TKO | 6 (12), 2:50 | 20 Dec 2003 | Bell Centre, Montreal, Quebec, Canada | Won vacant WBC interim super-middleweight title |
| 17 | Loss | 16–1 | (Germany) Markus Beyer | DQ | 5 (12) | 16 Aug 2003 | Nürburgring, Nürburg, Germany | For WBC super-middleweight title; Green disqualified for an intentional headbutt |
| 16 | Win | 16–0 | (Australia) Jason DeLisle | KO | 5 (12) | 2 Jun 2003 | Panthers World of Entertainment, Sydney, Australia | Retained IBF Pan Pacific super-middleweight title; Won vacant OPBF super-middleweight title |
| 15 | Win | 15–0 | (Argentina) Jorge Sclarandi | TKO | 6 (12) | 15 Mar 2003 | Challenge Stadium, Perth, Western Australia | Retained IBF Pan Pacific super-middleweight title |
| 14 | Win | 14–0 | (Australia) Brad Mayo | TKO | 1 (8) | 19 Jan 2003 | Telstra Dome, Melbourne, Australia | |
| 13 | Win | 13–0 | (India) Nico Toriri | KO | 3 (12) | 9 Nov 2002 | Challenge Stadium, Perth, Western Australia | Retained IBF Pan Pacific super-middleweight title |
| 12 | Win | 12–0 | (Fiji) Paula Tuilau | KO | 2 (12) | 27 Sep 2002 | Central Coast Division Rugby League, Gosford, Australia | Retained Oceanic Boxing Association light-heavyweight title |
| 11 | Win | 11–0 | (Australia) Joel Bourke | TKO | 4 (10) | 2 Aug 2002 | Le Montage, Sydney, Australia | |
| 10 | Win | 10–0 | (United States) Rhon Roberts | TKO | 3 (6), 1:25 | 18 May 2002 | (United States) Mandalay Bay Events Center, Paradise, Nevada, US | |
| 9 | Win | 9–0 | (Australia) Paul Smallman | KO | 8 (12) | 19 Apr 2002 | Le Montage, Sydney, Australia | Won vacant IBF Pan Pacific super-middleweight title |
| 8 | Win | 8–0 | (Fiji) Iobe Ledua | KO | 2 (8) | 8 Feb 2002 | Le Montage, Sydney, Australia | |
| 7 | Win | 7–0 | (New Zealand) Daniel Tai | TKO | 6 (10) | 7 Dec 2001 | RSL Club, Wyong, Australia | |
| 6 | Win | 6–0 | (New Zealand) Eni Latu | TKO | 3 (6), 1:14 | 16 Nov 2001 | Nineveh Sports Club, Sydney, Australia | |
| 5 | Win | 5–0 | (Australia) Heath Stenton | RTD | 2 (10), 3:00 | 26 Oct 2001 | Nineveh Sports Club, Sydney, Australia | Won vacant Oceanic Boxing Association light-heavyweight title |
| 4 | Win | 4–0 | (New Zealand) Jason Rarere | KO | 2 (6) | 18 Oct 2001 | Star City Casino, Sydney, Australia | |
| 3 | Win | 3–0 | (Fiji) Manueli Delaitabua | TKO | 2 (6) | 28 Sep 2001 | Octagon, Sydney, Australia | |
| 2 | Win | 2–0 | (Australia) Frank Ciampa | TKO | 2 (4) | 3 Aug 2001 | Bellevue Function Centre, Sydney, Australia | |
| 1 | Win | 1–0 | (Australia) Waqa Kolivuso | TKO | 2 (4) | 29 Jun 2001 | Bellevue Function Centre, Sydney, Australia | |

== Media ==
In 2006 a documentary called The Fight Game based on the earlier part of Green's career was released. Mick Angus followed Green for four years to produce the film, and said of Green: "He's no saint and Danny is the first to say that, but there is a degree of compassion that he wears on his sleeve."

A book about Green's career titled Closed Fist, Open Heart: The Danny Green Story was co-written by Green and Daniel Lane and released in 2008.

In February 2018, Green was revealed as an intruder contestant on the fourth season of the Australian version of I'm a Celebrity...Get Me Out of Here!. On 12 March 2018, Green came in third place.

== Bravery award ==
On 1 October 2006, Green rescued a drowning man at Yallingup beach. A keen surfer, "Green battled huge waves" to reach the man before paddling him back to shore. Upon recovery, the rescued man was reported to have said "This a story to tell the boys at the next party, getting rescued by Danny Green."

In 2011 the Australian Government awarded Green a Commendation for Brave Conduct, citing "Mid morning on 1 October 2006, Mr. Green rescued a man caught in a rip at Yallingup beach."

== Sydney to Hobart Yacht Race ==
Green competed in the 2009 Sydney to Hobart Yacht Race alongside Wallabies Phil Waugh and Phil Kearns, swimmer Grant Hackett, and the crew of the supermaxi yacht Investec Loyal. Following the race, Green is reported to have said "Nothing will ever erase the memory of that first night" and "I nearly fell off and I thought, 'I'm going to die'. Give me a fight any day." Green admitted a respect for the hard work performed by the sailors during the race.

Following slower-than-expected recovery from knee surgery, Green withdrew from the crew of the same boat in the 2010 Sydney to Hobart Yacht Race.

Due to medical advice and a "medical procedure" (following his loss to Poland's Włodarczyk in November 2011), Green was forced out of the 2011 Sydney to Hobart Yacht Race.

== Personal life ==
Green was born on 9 March 1973 in Perth, Western Australia. He is one of four children born to Malcolm and Maria Green. His father was born in Burracoppin as one of eleven children; he left school at the age of 15 and farmed sheep and wheat in the rural Wheatbelt locality of Warralakin. Green's father eventually moved the family to Perth "after yet another bad season", where he worked as a manager for Hungry Jack's and coached junior Australian rules football. About his father, Green stated: "Dad taught me the values he learned growing up in the bush and fighting his way out of tough times" and "He told me that no matter how many times you get knocked down, you can always pick yourself up and start again." Green was educated at Newman College in Perth.

Green's hobbies include surfing and ping-pong. He spends "part of his time off working for children's charities and aiding indigenous causes."

Green married his wife Nina in 2002 at the Elvis Chapel in Las Vegas, and they have two children: Chloe (born 2002) and Archie (born 2007). He has an older brother (Brendan, who was drafted by the West Coast Eagles in 1992 and also played for Claremont) and two sisters (Sharni and Narelle). Green lives in Perth.

Green supports the West Coast Eagles in the Australian Football League, and has often given pre-match pep talks to the players.

Following the 2012 king-hit attack on Daniel Christie, Green started the Stop The Coward Punch campaign, which aims to stop king hit attacks.

== Team Danny Green (TDGfit) ==
In early 2014, Danny Green launched an online health and fitness program called "Team Danny Green" (TDGfit) to tackle obesity and to help everyday people embrace a healthier lifestyle. Team Danny Green (TDGfit) features motivational tips from Danny himself plus food and exercise plans designed with some of Australia's top dietitians, nutritionists, exercise and sports scientists.

== Involvement with UBX Training ==
In late 2014, Green partnered with business associate Tim West, to launch a new Boxing Gym, called UBX Training (Formally known as 12 Round Fitness). The workout is built around 12 distinct stages (known as workout "Rounds"), that take a few minutes to complete, allowing members to "walk in" and work out any time without any fixed class time or schedule.

The brand has a multinational presence and leverages several smart wearable technologies such as MyZone, encouraging members to proactively monitor and track their progress.

In late 2021/Early 2022, UK franchise operator "Empowered Brands" partnered with UBX to launch a chain of 250 centres across the UK and Ireland in a deal worth £50 million, and in 2023 a new deal was announced with a partner in Japan, committing to opening an additional 145 new gyms.

Sporting positions
Regional boxing titles
| Vacant Title last held by Mosese Sorovi | OBA light-heavyweight champion 26 October 2001 – November 2002; Vacated | Vacant Title next held by Kali Jacobus |
| Vacant Title last held by Anthony Mundine | IBF Pan Pacific super-middleweight champion 19 April 2002 – August 2003; Vacated | Vacant Title next held by Daniel Lovett |
| Vacant Title last held by Yoshinori Nishizawa | OPBF super-middleweight champion 2 June 2003 – August 2003; Vacated | Vacant Title next held by Yoshinori Nishizawa |
| Preceded by Jason DeLisle | IBF Pan Pacific light-heavyweight champion 20 September 2006 – December 2007; Vacated | Vacant Title next held by Gareth Hogg |
| New title | PABA light-heavyweight champion Interim title 20 September 2006 – 21 January 2007; Won full title | Vacant Title next held by Beibut Shumenov |
| Preceded by Paul Murdoch | PABA light-heavyweight champion 21 January 2007 – December 2007; Vacated | Vacant Title next held by Daniel Lovett |
| Vacant Title last held by Marc Bargero | IBO Asia Pacific light-heavyweight champion 18 July 2007 – December 2007; Vacated | Vacant Title next held by Sonni Michael Angelo |
| Vacant Title last held by Aaron Russell | Australian cruiserweight champion 3 August 2016 – July 2017; Vacated | Vacant Title next held by Jai Opetaia |
Minor world boxing titles
| Vacant Title last held by Tomasz Adamek | IBO cruiserweight champion 15 August 2009 – 20 July 2011 | Succeeded by Antonio Tarver |
| Vacant Title last held by Antonio Tarver stripped | IBO cruiserweight champion 21 November 2012 – November 2013; Vacated | Succeeded by Ola Afolabi |
Major world boxing titles
| New title | WBC super-middleweight champion Interim title 20 December 2003 – 21 March 2005; Lost bid for full title | Vacant Title next held by David Benavidez |
| Preceded by Stipe Drews | WBA light-heavyweight champion 16 December 2007 – 25 March 2008; Retired | Vacant Title next held by Hugo Garay |
Awards
| Previous: David Hobson and Karina Schembri | Dancing with the Stars third place contestant Season 8 (2008 with Natalie Lowe) | Next: Kylie Gillies and Carmello Pizzino |
