= Boxing Australia =

Governing body for the sport of amateur boxing in Australia

Boxing Australia Ltd.
- Sport: Amateur boxing
- Jurisdiction: Australia
- Abbreviation: BAL
- Founded: 1924
- Affiliation: World Boxing
- Affiliation date: 13 August 2023
- Headquarters: AIS Combat Centre Leverrier Street Bruce ACT
- President: Phillip Goodes
- CEO: Dinah Glykidis
- Coach: Santiago Nieva
- Sponsor: Sting International

Official website
- www.boxing.org.au
- (Australia)

Boxing Australia Limited (BAL) is a governing body for the sport of amateur boxing in Australia. The Australian Sports Commission (ASC), Australian Olympic Committee (AOC), the Australian Commonwealth Games Association (ACGA), and World Boxing have recognized Boxing Australia as the National Sporting Organisation for amateur level boxing.

On 13 July 2023, following the International Olympic Committee's decision to expel the International Boxing Association from the Olympic movement because of alleged corruption involving its Russian organizers, Boxing Australia announced its intention to depart from the federation and join World Boxing. This decision was approved on 13 August 2023.

== High-performance programs ==
Boxing Australia has a range of high-performance programs. In 1997, the Australian Institute of Sport (AIS) introduced boxing as a scholarship sport. It started as a camp-based program, and by the early 2000s, boxing became a full-residential program at the AIS.

In 2005, Boxing was accepted as a program sport for the Australian Sports Commission's (ASC) National Talent Identification and Development (NTID) program, which focused on identifying indigenous and heavyweight talent.

In 2011, following the removal from the AIS Residential program, Boxing Australia assumed full ownership and management of its high-performance programs. The Boxing Australia Academy was established and operated from the Australian Institute of Sport in Canberra, based on centralized camps.

The Boxing Australia Centre of Excellence was established as a decentralized program within each state and territory. The program aims to identify talented boxers with the potential to represent their respective state or territory at future Australian Championships.

In 2013, the AIS Combat Centre was established; it houses the Boxing Australia training facilities.

In the 2013–14 season, the Centre of Excellence program evolved into the BAL Development Program, with a renewed emphasis on adolescent athletes with the potential to qualify for state/territory teams. The primary objectives of the Development Program are said to impart boxing terminology and skills to young boxers at an early age. This is meant to ensure that as they advance through the pathway, national coaches do not need to re-teach these fundamental skills but rather refine them.

Boxing Australia receives support from the Australian Sports Commission, with Combat AUS managing the high-performance program until 1 January 2025 when Boxing Australia resumed management of its high performance program.

== Structure ==
Boxing Australia adopts a federation-style organization with member association representation from a council, an elected board of directors, management and operational staff, standing committees, and Commissions.

== Board directors ==
The overarching management and strategic focus are handled by a board of seven directors, with the ability to coopt two non-voting directors plus the chief executive officer, Dinah Glykidis.

Name	Role
Phillip Goodes	President and chairperson
Julia Felton	Director
Simon Lew	Director
Wayne Tolton	Director
Steve Mannix	Director
Catherine Arlove	Director
Caroline Brown	Director

== Member association delegates ==
Name	Role
Troy Huckstepp	Boxing ACT delegate
Sean Fitzpatrick	Boxing Australia (NSW) delegate
Pennie Rochford	Boxing NT delegate
Mark Evans	Boxing Queensland delegate
Allison Goodes	Boxing SA delegate
Allison Ritchie	Boxing Tasmania delegate
David Pike	Boxing Victoria delegate
Geoff Peterson	Boxing WA delegate

== See also ==
- Australian National Boxing Federation, which governs professional boxing in Australia
- Boxing in Australia
