= Apollo Sweet =

Samoan/Australian boxer

Personal information
- Nationality: Samoan/Australian
- Born: 28 February 1957 (age 69) Samoa
- Weight: super middle/light heavycruiser/heavyweight

Boxing career
- Stance: Southpaw

Boxing record
- Total fights: 20
- Wins: 13 (KO 4)
- Losses: 4 (KO 1)
- Draws: 3

Apollo Sweet (born 28 February 1957) is a Samoan/Australian professional boxer of the 1980s and '90s who won the Oriental and Pacific Boxing Federation (OPBF) cruiserweight title, Australian cruiserweight title, Australasian cruiserweight title, and Commonwealth cruiserweight title. He drew with John Bogolin for the South Pacific cruiserweight title, and was a challenger for the New South Wales State cruiserweight title against Jeff Harding. His professional fighting weight varied from 165 3/4 lb (75.2 kg; 11 st 11.8 lb), i.e. super middleweight to 208 1/4 lb (94.5 kg; 14 st 12.3 lb), i.e. heavyweight.

== Professional Boxing Titles ==
- Australian national cruiserweight title (188½ Ibs)
- WBC - OPBF cruiserweight title (188½ Ibs)
- Australasian Cruiserweight Title (181½ Ibs)
- Commonwealth (British Empire) cruiserweight title (181½ Ibs)
