= Youssef Dib =

Australian professional boxer (born 1992)

Personal information
- Nationality: Australian
- Born: August 12, 1992 (age 33) Sydney, New South Wales, Australia
- Height: 5 ft 9 in / 175 cm
- Weight: Lightweight

Boxing career
- Reach: 69″ / 175 cm
- Stance: Orthodox

Boxing record
- Wins: 21
- Win by KO: 11
- Losses: 2

Youssef Dib is an Australian professional boxer competing in the light division. He made his debut on November 27, 2015. Dib stands at 5 feet 9 inches with a reach of 69 inches.

== Career ==
Dib has participated in 23 professional bouts, accumulating a total of 116 rounds. He has secured 21 wins, including 11 by knockout, and has experienced 2 losses, 1 of which was by knockout.

In his 20th professional fight, Dib won the IBF Australasian Light belt against Miles Zalewski marking a significant achievement in his career. He lost in his first defeat against Ibrahim Balla. It was also Youssef Dib's first loss as a professional boxer.

== Personal life and background ==
Dib resides in Sydney, New South Wales, Australia.
