= Anthony Bigeni =

New Zealand boxer

- Born: Anthony Bigeni; 26 December 1963 (age 62)
- Nationality: New Zealander
- Weight: 181 lb (82 kg; 12 st 13 lb)
- Division: Cruiserweight; Light Heavyweight
- Years active: 1992-2002

Professional boxing record
- Total: 32
- Wins: 22
- By knockout: 14
- Losses: 10
- By knockout: 5
- Draws: 0

Other information
- Boxing record from BoxRec

Anthony Bigeni (born 26 December 1963) is a retired boxer from New Zealand. He lost to Richard Hall for the World Boxing Association interim light heavyweight world title.

== Professional Boxing Titles ==
- New Zealand Boxing Association cruiserweight title (190 Ibs) 1994
- WBA - PABA light heavyweight title (174¼ Ibs) 1995
- Australasian light heavyweight title (174½ Ibs) 1996
- WBA - PABA light heavyweight title (174 Ibs) 1997
- WBA - PABA light heavyweight title (174¾ Ibs) 2000
- South Pacific cruiserweight title 2001
