= Australian National Boxing Federation =

Sports governing body in Australia

- Sport: Professional boxing
- Jurisdiction: Australia
- Abbreviation: ANBF
- Founded: 1965
- Affiliation: Commonwealth Boxing Council
- Regional affiliation: Australasia
- President: Derek Milham
- Vice president: Charlie Lucas
- Secretary: Andrew Campbell
- Operating income: Title match sanction fee

Official website
- anbf.org.au
- Other key staff: Adam Height
- (Australia)

Australian National Boxing Federation (ANBF) is the governing body for the sport of professional boxing in Australia. Established in 1965, the organisation oversees national championship titles, rankings, and regulations for professional boxing across the country.

The ANBF operates alongside Boxing Australia, which governs amateur boxing and sanctions professional bouts and maintains national title structures.

== History ==
The organisation was founded in 1965 as the Australian Boxing Federation in an effort to establish a unified governing body for professional boxing in Australia. In 1980s, the body took its current name of Australian National Boxing Federation. In 1977, the Australian Boxing Federation joined the Oriental and Pacific Boxing Federation and Pan Asian Boxing Association.

== Structure ==
The national body has four state member associations – Queensland, New South Wales, Victoria and South Australia.

== Current Champions ==
=== Male Champions ===
This table showing the male boxers who have won the Australian professional championship.

Weight class:	Champion:	Reign began:
Light Flyweight	Kha Lu	4 April 2025
Flyweight	Title Vacant	
Super Flyweight	Title Vacant	
Bantamweight	Title Vacant	
Super Bantamweight	Emiliano Tissera	29 March 2025
Featherweight	Tyler Blizzard	7 September 2024
Super Featherweight	Title Vacant	
Lightweight	Tom Fitzgerald	24 August 2024
Super Lightweight	Title Vacant	
Welterweight	Jason Mallia	19 September 2024
Super Welterweight	Koen Mazoudier	6 April 2025
Middleweight	Xavier Fletcher	28 March 2025
Super Middleweight	Max Reeves	28 March 2025
Light Heavyweight	Kirra Ruston	12 March 2025
Cruiserweight	Title Vacant	
Heavyweight	Stevan Ivic	12 October 2025

=== Female Champions ===
This table showing the female boxers who have won the Australian professional championship.

Weight class:	Champion:	Reign began:
Super Flyweight	Serena Kingdon	9 November 2012
Bantamweight	Sylvia Scharper	3 September 2011
Super Bantamweight	April Adams	22 October 2011
Featherweight	Kori Farr	17 September 2011
Super Featherweight	Lauryn Eagle	17 August 2013
Lightweight	Sabrina Ostowari	10 May 2014
Super Lightweight	Deanha Hobbs	17 August 2013

== See also ==
- List of Australian female boxing champions
- List of Australian heavyweight boxing champions
- List of Australian cruiserweight boxing champions
- List of Australian middleweight boxing champions
- Boxing in Australia
- Boxing Australia
- Commonwealth Boxing Council
