= Phil Gregory =

British rower

Personal information
- Nationality: British
- Born: August 1954 (age 71–72) Derby

Sport
- Sport: Rowing

Philip Sisson Gregory (born August 1954) is a retired British rower who competed for Great Britain.

== Rowing career ==
Gregory was part of the eight that reached the final and finished 5th, at the 1977 World Rowing Championships in Amsterdam.

== Personal life ==
By trade he is the Managing Director of Janousek Racing Boats and Stämpfli Racing Boats.
