= Togasilimai Letoa =

Samoan boxer

- Born: 16 April 1982 (age 44); Lalomauga, Samoa
- Nationality: Samoan
- Weight: 174.5 lb (79 kg; 12 st 7 lb)
- Division: Light Heavyweight
- Style: Boxing
- Stance: Southpaw
- Years active: 2007–present

Professional boxing record
- Total: 36
- Wins: 16
- By knockout: 8
- Losses: 19
- By knockout: 6
- Draws: 1

Other information
- Boxing record from BoxRec
- Last updated on: 28 January 2017

Togasilimai Letoa (born 16 April 1982) is a Samoan professional boxer.

Letoa has fought for six regional belts in his career, including winning the WBC – OPBF Light Heavyweight title against Manny Vlamis. Letoa is the first Samoan National Light Heavyweight Champion, winning the title against Miki Otto Ropati in 2009.

== Professional boxing titles ==
- Samoa
  - Samoa National light heavyweight title (174½ Ibs)
- World Boxing Council
  - OPBF light heavyweight title (172 Ibs)

== Professional boxing record ==
| 36 fights | 16 wins | 19 losses |
|---|---|---|
| By knockout | 8 | 6 |
| By decision | 8 | 13 |
| Draws | 1 | |

| No. | Result | Record | Opponent | Type | Round, time | Date | Location | Notes |
|---|---|---|---|---|---|---|---|---|
| 36 | Lose | 16–19–1 | Jai Opetaia | TKO | 1 (4) | 10 February 2017 | Faleata Sports Complex Gym 1, Apia, Samoa | |
| 35 | Lose | 16–18–1 | Sam Rapira | UD | 8 | 2 April 2016 | TSB Stadium, New Plymouth, New Zealand | |
| 34 | Lose | 16–17–1 | Jake Carr | TKO | 6 (8) 1:41 | 8 August 2015 | North Sydney Rugby League Club, Cammeray, New South Wales, Australia | |
| 33 | Win | 16–16–1 | Joseph Kwadjo | UD | 10 | 7 July 2015 | Apia, Samoa | |
| 32 | Lose | 15–16–1 | Robert Berridge | TKO | 5 (8) 1:18 | 6 March 2015 | Royal Exhibition Building, Carlton, Victoria, Australia | |
| 31 | Win | 15–15–1 | Sakeasi Dakua | TKO | 1 (6) 2:48 | 7 December 2014 | Faleata Sports Complex Gym 1, Apia, Samoa | |
| 30 | Lose | 14–15–1 | Adrian Taihia | UD | 12 | 22 May 2014 | Logan Campbell Centre, Auckland, New Zealand | WBA – PABA light heavyweight title |
| 29 | Lose | 14–14–1 | Affif Belghecham | PTS | 6 | 29 March 2014 | Omnisports Stadium, Noumea, New Caledonia | |
| 28 | Win | 14–13–1 | Falanisisi Mamoe | UD | 6 | 19 December 2013 | Faleata Sports Complex Gym 1, Apia, Samoa | |
| 27 | Lose | 13–13–1 | Rohan Murdock | MD | 6 | 20 September 2013 | Southport Sharks AFL Club, Southport, Queensland, Australia | |
| 26 | Lose | 13–12–1 | Damien Hooper | KO | 5 (6) 0:37 | 8 August 2013 | Southport RSL Club, Southport, Queensland, Australia | |
| 25 | Win | 13–11–1 | Faimasasa Tavu'i | PTS | 4 | 30 May 2013 | Faleata Sports Complex Gym 1, Apia, Samoa | |
| 24 | Lose | 12–11–1 | Garth Wood | TKO | 9 (12) 1:12 | 15 February 2013 | All Sorts Arena, Alexandria, New South Wales, Australia | vacant WBA – PABA light heavyweight title |
| 23 | Lose | 12–10–1 | Tyrone Jones | UD | 6 | 30 November 2012 | Mansfield Tavern, Mansfield, Queensland, Australia | |
| 22 | Win | 12–9–1 | Manny Vlamis | TKO | 3 (12) 2:16 | 30 March 2012 | Town Hall, Malvern, Victoria, Australia | WBC – OPBF light heavyweight title |
| 21 | Lose | 11–9–1 | Xavier Lucas | UD | 6 | 20 November 2011 | Cockburn Basketball Stadium, Hamilton Hill, Western Australia, Australia | |
| 20 | Draw | 11–8–1 | Jeremy Allan | PTS | 6 | 5 August 2011 | Goldfields Oasis Recreation Centre, Kalgoorlie, Western Australia, Australia | |
| 19 | Lose | 11–8 | Blake Caparello | TKO | 1 (6) 2:59 | 13 May 2011 | The Melbourne Pavilion, Flemington, Victoria, Australia | |
| 18 | Lose | 11–7 | Robbie Bryant | UD | 12 | 12 March 2011 | WA Italian Club, Perth, Western Australia, Australia | vacant WBA – PABA middleweight title |
| 17 | Lose | 11–6 | Serge Yannick | UD | 12 | 3 December 2010 | Town Hall, Coburg, Victoria, Australia | interim WBA – PABA super middleweight title |
| 16 | Lose | 11–5 | Jamie Pittman | UD | 6 | 31 October 2010 | Olympic Park Sports Centre, Homebush, New South Wales, Australia | |
| 15 | Lose | 11–4 | Tim Bell | UD | 10 | 13 February 2010 | Tribal Punishment Gym, Epping, Victoria, Australia | |
| 14 | Lose | 11–3 | Soulan Pownceby | UD | 12 | 28 August 2009 | ASB Stadium, Kohimarama, New Zealand | vacant WBO Asia Pacific light heavyweight title |
| 13 | Win | 11–2 | Uale Leota | TKO | 4 (6) | 29 July 2009 | South Pacific Boxing Arena, Vaiusu Bay, Samoa | |
| 12 | Lose | 10–2 | Michael Bolling | UD | 6 | 9 July 2009 | Luna Park, Sydney, New South Wales, Australia | |
| 11 | Win | 10–1 | Panapa Seve | KO | 2 (4) 2:00 | 2 June 2009 | Faleata Sports Complex Gym 1, Apia, Samoa | |
| 10 | Win | 9–1 | Alapati Kitiona | KO | 1 (10) 2:46 | 30 April 2009 | Faleata Sports Complex Gym 1, Apia, Samoa | Samoa National light heavyweight title |
| 9 | Win | 8–1 | Faitua Shine Kalolo | TKO | 1 (6) | 21 April 2009 | Leisure Centre, Otara, New Zealand | |
| 8 | Win | 7–1 | Miki Otto Ropati | UD | 10 | 31 January 2009 | Marist Hall, Apia, Samoa | vacant Samoa National light heavyweight title |
| 7 | Win | 6–1 | Rhys King | KO | 5 (6) | 25 November 2008 | Leisure Centre, Otara, New Zealand | |
| 6 | Win | 5–1 | Alapati Kitiona | TKO | 6 (6) 2:00 | 8 October 2008 | Vaiusu Boxing Arena, Vaiusu, Samoa | |
| 5 | Lose | 4–1 | Soulan Pownceby | MD | 4 | 16 September 2008 | Leisure Centre, Otara, New Zealand | |
| 4 | Win | 4–0 | Samuelu Togafiti | UD | 4 | 22 March 2008 | Faleata Sports Complex Gym 1, Apia, Samoa | |
| 3 | Win | 3–0 | Uale Leota | UD | 6 | 8 February 2008 | Faleata Sports Complex Gym 1, Apia, Samoa | |
| 2 | Win | 2–0 | Ielome Lisaki | UD | 6 | 17 November 2007 | The Chinese Hall, Apia, Samoa | |
| 1 | Win | 1–0 | Ioane Talamauga | UD | 6 | 2 June 2007 | The Chinese Hall, Apia, Samoa | |
