= Sam Rapira (boxer) =

New Zealand boxer (born 1983)

- Born: Samuel Rapira; 2 November 1983 (age 43); New Plymouth, New Zealand
- Other names: The Terror
- Height: 182 cm (6 ft 0 in)
- Weight: 79.3 kg (175 lb; 12 st 7 lb)
- Division: Light Heavyweight
- Reach: 183 cm (72.0 in)
- Stance: Orthodox
- Trainer: Lolo Heimuli
- Years active: 2013–2017

Professional boxing record
- Total: 21
- Wins: 16
- By knockout: 10
- Losses: 5
- By knockout: 3
- Draws: 0

Amateur record
- Total: 25
- Wins: 18
- Losses: 7

Other information
- Occupation: Promoter and Professional Boxer
- Notable relatives: Sam Rapira (Cousins)
- Website: www.rapiraboxing.co.nz
- Boxing record from BoxRec
- Last updated on: 28 January 2017

Sam Rapira (born 2 November 1983) is a New Zealand boxing promoter and professional boxer.

Prior to his fighting in any professional matches, Rapira participated in twenty-five amateur bouts.

== Amateur career ==
Rapira has fought in twenty-five amateur boxing matches, fighting local stars like Reece Papuni and Gunnar Jackson, Australian Damien Hooper, and German Champion, Enrice Koelling. Rapira biggest win was at the 2011 Arafura Games where he won the silver medal in the 81 kg division. The biggest upset of the tournament was when Rapira defeated world ranked number one at the time Vijender Singh. Sam Rapira was the captain of the New Zealand Boxing team, which went on to win five Golds and three Silvers.

== Professional career ==
=== New Zealand dream fights, international fights 2016 ===
In July 2016, Rapira Announced that he will be self promoting his 8th show with Rapira taking on Robert Berridge in the main event. This is one of New Zealand's most talked about dream fight in the light heavyweight weight division. The bout took place at TSB Stadium in September 2016. Berridge won the bout by unanimous decision. After the bout Berridge commented on how poor referee David Craig (who is also President of New Zealand National Boxing Federation) officiated the fight, with the lack of control and not stepping in when there was too much holding or wrestling. On 29 October 2016, it was announced that Rapira would face Ryan Ford on 17 February 2017 for the Vacant UBO World Light Heavyweight Championship. He lost the fight via TKO in the ninth round.

=== Retirement 2017 - 2018 ===
On 5 April 2017, Rapira announced his retirement fight which will take place on 26 May against undefeated boxer, Tipene Maniapoto. Rapira final undercard will include the debut of Tania Reid going up against Wendy Talbot and Taranaki's Simon Jullen going against Taihiti's Tautu Brillant. A few days before the bout, Rapira announce that the fight was upgraded to a title bout for the PABA title. Rapira won the bout by Unanimous Decision with Maniapoto being knocked down multiple times throughout the bout. On 19 May 2018, Rapria made his return to the ring to take on Ratu Dawai for the New Zealand National (PBCNZ version) Light Heavyweight title. Rapira lost the fight by TKO when his trainer threw in the towel in round seven, ending the career for Rapira. Since retiring from the ring, Rapira remains an active promoter, putting on regular boxing events throughout the year.

=== Health problems after boxing ===
Since retiring from boxing, Rapira has been diagnosed with Dementia Pugilistica also known as Chronic traumatic encephalopathy. He stated he started feeling the CTE symptoms before his last fight in 2018. Rapira is urging people taking part in combat sports to use the best protective equipment available.

== Championships ==
- New Zealand National Boxing Federation
  - New Zealand National Light Heavyweight Title (174¼ Ibs)
- International Boxing Organization
  - IBO Asia Pacific Light Heavyweight Title (173¾ Ibs)
- World Boxing Association
  - PABA Light Heavyweight Title

== Professional boxing record ==
21 fights	16 wins	5 losses
By knockout	10	3
By decision	6	2

No.	Result	Record	Opponent	Type	Round, time	Date	Location	Notes
21	Lose	16–5	(New Zealand) Ratu Dawai	TKO	7 (10), 1:18	19 May 2018	TSB Stadium, New Plymouth, New Zealand	Vacant New Zealand National (PBCNZ version) Light Heavyweight Title
20	Win	16–4	(New Zealand) Tipene Maniapoto	UD	10	26 May 2017	TSB Stadium, New Plymouth, New Zealand	Won Vacant PABA Light Heavyweight Title
19	Loss	15–4	(Canada) Ryan Ford	TKO	9 (12), 2:09	17 February 2017	Foochow Building, Singapore	For Vacant UBO World Light Heavyweight Title
18	Lose	15–3	(New Zealand) Robert Berridge	UD	8	16 September 2016	TSB Stadium, New Plymouth, New Zealand	
17	Win	15–2	(New Zealand) Craig Turner	TKO	4 (6)	30 June 2016	Standfords Event Centre, Ōpunake, New Zealand	
16	Win	14–2	(Samoa) Togasilimai Letoa	UD	8	2 April 2016	TSB Stadium, New Plymouth, New Zealand	
15	Win	13–2	(Samoa) (New Zealand) Vaimoli Ioelu	UD	4	25 February 2016	ABA Stadium, Auckland, New Zealand	
14	Win	12–2	(New Zealand) Sivan Hermez	TKO	4 (6)	12 December 2015	The Hub, Hawera New Zealand	
13	Loss	11–2	(Australia) Rob Powdrill	SD	10	22 August 2015	TSB Stadium, New Plymouth, New Zealand	For Vacant IBO Intercontinental Light Heavyweight Title
12	Win	11–1	(New Zealand) Sam Loli	UD	6	26 June 2015	Standfords Event Centre, Ōpunake, New Zealand	
11	Win	10–1	(Australia) Dean Purdon	KO	3 (10) 2:46	18 April 2015	TSB Stadium, New Plymouth, New Zealand	Won Vacant IBO Asia Pacific Light Heavyweight Title
10	Win	9–1	(Fiji) (New Zealand) Edwin Samy	SD	6	7 February 2015	War Memorial Hall, Waitara, New Zealand	
9	Loss	8–1	(New Zealand) Reece Papuni	TKO	4 (10)	16 October 2014	The Trusts Arena, Auckland, New Zealand	Lost New Zealand National (NZNBF version) Light Heavyweight Title
8	Win	8–0	(United Kingdom) (New Zealand) Richard Hackney	KO	5 (10)	12 September 2014	TSB Stadium, New Plymouth, New Zealand	Won Vacant New Zealand National (NZNBF version) Light Heavyweight Title
7	Win	7–0	(Fiji) (New Zealand) Taito Ratuere	UD	6	4 June 2014	The Trusts Arena, Auckland, New Zealand	
6	Win	6–0	(Pakistan) (New Zealand) Kashif Mumtaz	TKO	2 (6) 2:43	14 February 2014	TSB Stadium, New Plymouth, New Zealand	
5	Win	5–0	(Samoa) (New Zealand) Moses Ioelu	KO	4 (6)	13 December 2013	YMCA Gymnasium, New Plymouth, New Zealand	
4	Win	4–0	(Fiji) Isaia Maku Jnr	TKO	1 (6) 2:21	16 November 2013	Claudelands Arena, Hamilton, New Zealand	
3	Win	3–0	(Samoa) (New Zealand) Atalili Fai	TKO	3 (4)	10 October 2013	The Trusts Arena, Auckland, New Zealand	
2	Win	2–0	(New Zealand) Viliami Toafi	TKO	1 (4) 2:09	13 June 2013	The Trusts Arena, Auckland, New Zealand	
1	Win	1–0	(Tonga) (New Zealand) Scott Taliauli	TKO	3 (4) 0:35	6 April 2013	TSB Stadium, New Plymouth, New Zealand	

== Personal life and charity work ==
Born in, New Plymouth, New Zealand, Rapira is the cousin of New Zealand rugby league international, Sam Rapira. Rapira, his brother Jake and their co-owned boxing gym do regular charity work for the community and SPCA. Their biggest contribution is organizing food banks for the winter months and Christmas Season. They donate to the community including the food banks on average a hundred times a month.

== Awards and recognitions ==
- 2019 Gladrap Boxing Awards Event of the year (Won)

Vacant Title last held by Taito Ratuere; Stripped	New Zealand National (NZNBF version) Light Heavyweight; Title; 12 September 2014 – 16 October 2014	Succeeded by Reece Papuni
Vacant Title last held by Sonni Michael Angelo; Vacated	IBO Asia Pacific Light Heavyweight; Title; 18 April 2015 – 22 August 2015	Incumbent
