= Guillermo Mosquera =

Colombian boxer (1964–2017)

- Born: Guillermo Mosquera; 26 October 1964; Buenaventura, Colombia
- Died: 4 December 2017 (aged 53); Rome, Italy
- Other names: La Pantera
- Nationality: Colombian
- Weight: 140 lb (64 kg; 10 st 0 lb)
- Division: Super Lightweight
- Stance: Orthodox
- Years active: 1985 – 2001; 2004; 2006 – 2010; 2012

Professional boxing record
- Total: 55
- Wins: 42
- By knockout: 21
- Losses: 10
- By knockout: 5
- Draws: 3

Other information
- Boxing record from BoxRec

Pantera Guillermo Mosquera (26 October 1964 – 4 December 2017), known professionally as La Pantera, was a professional boxer and a boxing trainer. During his professional boxing career, Mosquera fought in 9 different countries including Colombia, Italy, New Zealand, Australia and more. Mosquera won multiple credible titles including WBC International Super Lightweight Title, WBA – PABA Super Lightweight Title and the World Boxing Foundation World Super Lightweight Title. He started his professional career in Colombia but eventually Mosquera moved to Italy in the mid to late 1980s. In the 1990s, Mosquera moved to New Zealand where he eventually won the New Zealand national title in 2004. While in New Zealand, Mosquera started training boxers. His most notable boxer was Adrian Taihia while he was in The Contender Australia. Mosquera ended his career in Spain in 2012 where he lived in Valencia, Comunidad Valenciana. Mosquera lived the remainder of his life in Italy where he owned a boxing gym. In 2017, after a long battle, Mosquera died of cancer. He had his funeral at the church of the SS Annunziata in Via del Sole.

== Boxing Titles ==
- World Boxing Council
  - International Super Lightweight Title (138¾ Ibs)
- World Boxing Association
  - Pan Asian Boxing Association Super Lightweight Title (139¾ Ibs)
- New Zealand Boxing Association
  - New Zealand National Super Lightweight Title (139 Ibs)
- World Boxing Association
- World Boxing Foundation
  - World Super Lightweight Title (140 Ibs)

== Professional boxing record ==
55 fights	42 wins	10 losses
By knockout	21	5
By decision	21	3
By disqualification	0	2
Draws	3	
