= Robert Berridge =

New Zealand boxer (born 1984)

- Born: 22 November 1984 (age 41); Whanganui, New Zealand
- Other names: The Butcher
- Nationality: New Zealand
- Height: 173 cm (5 ft 8 in)
- Weight: 79.0 kg (174 lb; 12 st 6 lb)
- Division: Light Heavyweight
- Reach: 178 cm (70.1 in)
- Stance: Southpaw
- Years active: 2009–2017, 2018, 2021

Professional boxing record
- Total: 42
- Wins: 30
- By knockout: 22
- Losses: 11
- By knockout: 6
- Draws: 1

Other information
- Occupation: Professional Boxer
- Boxing record from BoxRec
- Last updated on: 15 December 2018

Robert Berridge (born 22 November 1984) is a retired New Zealand professional light heavyweight boxer.

Berridge is a boxer who has had over thirty fights, five boxing titles and has peaked at ninth on the World Boxing Organization and twelfth on the World Boxing Association rankings in 2014. In 2009, Berridge made his debut against Royden Lee at ABA Stadium. In 2015 in South Africa, Berridge had his first World title bout against Thomas Oosthuizen for the International Boxing Organization Light Heavyweight title. Berridge lost by unanimous decision. Berridge's second World title shot was for the Interim WBA World Light Heavyweight Title against Dmitry Bivol. Berridge lost by TKO.

== Professional career ==
=== Pre Duco, First boxing titles 2009–2013 ===
Berridge suffered his first lost against Blake Caparello by unanimous decision. Berridge took the fight with very short notice. A rematch has always been talked about with Caparello, but nothing has ever came from it. The NZPBAssn presented Berridge with the Association's New Zealand Light Heavyweight title. His manager/promoter Vasco Kovacevic tried six boxers of standing to match Robbie for the title. All declined for various reasons. Robbie made a token appearance in the ring in a 4 x 3 bout against Moses Ioelu. Moses was the only one who volunteered to get in the ring, but with only 4 x 3's. Robbie was presented the belt after the bout. Berridge got the biggest win of his career after he defeated world ranked Australian Boxer Serge Yannick. Berridge won by TKO in the 8th round. Berridge won his first regional title against Shintaro Matsumoto in July 2013 at ABA Stadium for the WBC Asian Boxing Council Light Heavyweight title. Berridge won by TKO in the fifth round.

=== Under Duco Boxing 2013–2014 ===
Berridge won his next two boxing title against New Zealander Daniel MacKinnon for the vacant WBA Pan Asian Boxing Association title and vacant WBO Oriental title. Berridge won TKO in the tenth round. MacKinnon was rushed to hospital after the fight. After a CT scan it was discovered that MacKinnon had a brain bleed and had emergency surgery. MacKinnon was in a coma however woke up less than 24 hours after the surgery. MacKinnon made a fully recover however his boxing career is over. Berridge suffered his second lose to Lepikhin in his first fight in America, losing both of his regional titles. Lepikhin is five and half inches taller and had a four-inch reach advantage. Berridge lost by TKO in the fifth round. While under Duco he reached 22nd on Boxrec, 10th in WBO, 12th in WBA and including being his 4 wins on Duco Event fight nights, he had a 9 win streak, including wins over Mariano Jose Riva, Daniel MacKinnon, Kerry Foley, Rogerio Damasco and more.

=== Post Duco, IBO World title, Tournament, NZ title defense 2015–2016 ===
Berridge went for his first world title in June 2015 against IBO Champion Thomas Oosthuizen in South Africa. Berridge also took this fight at short notice. Controversy came around this bout as Oosthuizen did not make weight. When given the opportunity came to give Oosthuizen two hours to shed off the excess weight, he came weighing even more than the first weigh in. There has been reports that promoters try to convince Berridge's team to postpone the bout, however the bout went on. The World Title was declared vacant with the stipulation added that if Oosthuizen won the title will remain vacant, however if Berridge won he would be the new World Champion. Also thirty percent of Oosthuizen's purse was forfeited to Berridge. Berridge unfortunately suffered his third lose of his career by Unanimous Decisionand the title remain vacant. In November 2015 Berridge competed in the Super Eight Boxing Tournament. Usually the Super 8 is a one night eight man tournament, However the Super 8 rebranded into 2 four man tournaments in one night. The other men in the tournament are Christchurch's Reece Papuni & Brad Riddell and Auckland's Sefo Falekaono. Both Berridge and Papuni won their first fights, with both bouts going the extra round due to original score ending in a draw. Berridge fought Sefo Falekaono in the first round in the tournament. Berridge took on Papuni in the finals with the bout again going into the 4th round due to original score ending in a draw. The bout ended with Papuni winning the bout by Unanimous decision. In July 2016, Sam Rapira Announced that he will be self-promoting his 8th show with Rapira taking on Berridge in the main event. This is one of New Zealand's most talked about dream fight in the light heavyweight weight division. The bout took place at TSB Stadium in September 2016. Berridge won the bout by unanimous decision. After the bout Berridge commented on how poor referee David Craig (who is also President of New Zealand Professional Boxing Federation) officiated the fight, with the lack of control and not stepping in when there was too much holding or wrestling. In October 2016, Berridge took on long time rival Adrian Taihia, defending Berridges New Zealand (NZPBA version) Light Heavyweight title for the second time. This bout has been five years in the making where the two call each other out multiple times, including a WWE like style from Taihia when Berridge finished fighting in a bout on PPV. The two were scheduled to face each other in 2013, however Berridge pulled out due to injury. During the weigh in, the two had a war of words in which resulted in push from Taihia, push Berridge into a couple of tables and breaking the contents on the tables. Berridge won the bout by unanimous decision. Taihia was showing a Floyd Mayweather like boxing style, but it was Taihia low punch output and Berridge aggression that won Berridge the bout. Shortly after the fight Taihia announced his retirement from the ring, stating that he felt he was robbed from the fight and that he lost his passion in the sport.

=== World Title Shots and Retirement 2017 ===
In January 2017, Berridge announced on his Facebook page that he will be taking on Russia's Dmitry Bivol for the Interim WBA World Light Heavyweight Title. Berridge lost the bout in the 4th round by TKO, stopped by the ringside doctor due to a major cut. In May 2017, Berridge took on Canadian Ryan Ford for the Universal Boxing Organisation World Light Heavyweight title. Due to a head clash in round 6, it caused a bad cut to Berridge which happens regularly for Berridge. The bout stopped in round 7 due to the cut being bad, with Ford winning on points by Technical Decision. A week after the fight, Berridge announced on his Facebook that he is retiring from professional boxing.

=== Comeback 2018 ===
In April 2018, Berridge announce he will be making a comeback in the Cruiserweight division. However, due to a broken hand during training he was not able to compete and the injury required surgery. On 14 December 2018, Berridge made his return into the ring at ABA Stadium against Bordin Peepueh, but staying in the light heavyweight division. Peepueh continuously stayed on the back foot as Berridge hunted down his opponent in the ring. Berridge knocked his opponent down twice before the referee waived it off in the first round.

== Controversy ==
In December 2014 Berridge became highly intoxicated at a Duco Events Fight for Life in Hamilton, New Zealand. Due to his training regime he did not usually drink and became highly intoxicated as a result. On the way back home Berridge jumped out of the car that his manager was driving on the way back to his home to Auckland with Berridge and his wife. The car was going 100 km/h. When Berridge's wife tried to get him back in the car, he lashed out and hit his wife. The manager and Berridge's wife decided to leave him there while Berridge himself tried to walk and hitchhike home the next morning. Shortly after this had happen Duco Event's released Berridge out of there stable and his contract. Berridge was signed to a six-year contract with Duco but only fought three times under the contract which may have led to his increasing frustration under Duco and not being on the Fight for Life. Since the incident Berridge has been highly apologetic to the people he disappointed with his behaviour.

In May 2016, Berridge had pulled out of a fight on Joseph Parker vs Carlos Takam undercard due to neck injury. Berridge was scheduled to fight Joseph Kwadjo, however Berridge was replaced by Nikolas Charalampous. Berridge Stated that the fight was hard to come about as Duco Events (the promoter of the event) were refusing to pay Berridge, making him and his team having to pay the purse for both him and his opponent and other benefits such as flights and accommodation. After Berridge pulled out, Duco found and paid for an opponent (Nikolas Charalampous) without reimbursing Berridge.

== Professional boxing titles ==
- New Zealand Professional Boxing Association
  - New Zealand National Light Heavyweight title (174½ Ibs)
- World Boxing Council
  - WBC Asian Boxing Council Light Heavyweight Title (173¾ Ibs)
- World Boxing Association
  - Pan Asian Boxing Association Light Heavyweight Title (173½ Ibs)
- World Boxing Organization
  - WBO Oriental Light Heavyweight Title (173½ Ibs)
- International Boxing Organization
  - IBO Oceania Light Heavyweight Title (174¼ Ibs)

== Professional boxing record ==
42 fights	30 wins	11 losses
By knockout	22	6
By decision	7	5
By disqualification	1	0
Draws	1	

No.	Result	Record	Opponent	Type	Round, time	Date	Location	Notes
42	Loss	30–11–1	(New Zealand) David Nyika	TKO	3 (8), 1:00	3 Nov 2023	Gatton Shire Hall, Gatton, Australia	
41	Loss	30–10–1	(Australia) Emilio Leti Jr	TKO	5 (6), 2:10	12 Aug 2023	ABA Stadium, Auckland, New Zealand	
40	Loss	30–9–1	(Australia) Paulo Aokuso	TKO	2 (10), 1:09	29 Jun 2022	Brisbane Convention & Exhibition Centre, Brisbane, Australia	For Australian National Boxing Federation Australasian light heavyweight title
39	Loss	30–8–1	(Australia) Issac Hardman	TKO	8 (8), 1:37	26 May 2021	(Australia) Aware Super Theatre, Sydney, New South Wales	
38	Win	30–7–1	(Thailand) Bordin Peepueh	KO	1 (8), 2:19	14 Dec 2018	ABA Stadium, Auckland, New Zealand	
37	Loss	29–7–1	(Canada) Ryan Ford	TD	7 (12), 3:00	27 May 2017	Resorts World Sentosa, Sentosa, Singapore	For UBO light heavyweight title
36	Loss	29–6–1	(Russia) Dmitry Bivol	TKO	4 (12), 0:47	23 Feb 2017	Forum, Nizhny Tagil, Russia	For WBA interim light heavyweight title
35	Win	29–5–1	(New Zealand) Adrian Taihia	UD	10	28 Oct 2016	ASB Stadium, Auckland, New Zealand	Retained NZPBA light heavyweight title
34	Win	28–5–1	(New Zealand) Sam Rapira	UD	8	16 Sep 2016	TSB Stadium, New Plymouth, New Zealand	
33	Loss	27–5–1	(Colombia) Eleider Álvarez	UD	10	29 July 2016	Centre Vidéotron, Quebec City, Canada	
32	Loss	27–4–1	(New Zealand) Reece Papuni	SD	4	3 Nov 2015	SkyCity Convention Centre, Auckland, New Zealand	Super 8 Boxing Tournament: light heavyweight final
31	Win	27–3–1	(New Zealand) Sefo Falekaono	UD	4	3 Nov 2015	SkyCity Convention Centre, Auckland, New Zealand	Super 8 Boxing Tournament: light heavyweight semi-final
30	Loss	26–3–1	(South Africa) Thomas Oosthuizen	UD	12	6 Jun 2015	Emperors Palace, Johannesburg, South Africa	For vacant IBO light heavyweight title
29	Win	26–2–1	(New Zealand) Andrew Robinson	UD	10	25 Apr 2015	Springvale Stadium, Whanganui, New Zealand	Retained NZPBA light heavyweight title; Won vacant IBO Oceania light heavyweight
28	Win	25–2–1	(Samoa) Togasilimai Letoa	TKO	5 (8), 1:18	6 Mar 2015	Royal Exhibition Building, Melbourne, Australia	
27	Loss	24–2–1	(Russia) Vasily Lepikhin	TKO	5 (12), 1:04	9 Aug 2014	(United States) Sands Bethlehem Event Center, Bethlehem, Pennsylvania, US	Lost PABA and WBO Oriental light heavyweight titles
26	Win	24–1–1	(Brazil) Rogerio Damasco	TKO	1 (12), 2:16	5 Jul 2014	Vodafone Events Centre, Auckland, New Zealand	Retained PABA and WBO Oriental light heavyweight titles
25	Win	23–1–1	(Australia) Kerry Foley	TKO	10 (12), 2:12	19 Feb 2014	Hordern Pavilion, Sydney, Australia	Retained PABA light heavyweight title
24	Win	22–1–1	(New Zealand) Daniel MacKinnon	TKO	10 (12), 2:51	16 Nov 2013	Claudelands Arena, Hamilton, New Zealand	Won vacant PABA and WBO Oriental light heavyweight titles
23	Win	21–1–1	(Argentina) Mariano Jose Riva	KO	3 (8), 0:32	10 Oct 2013	The Trusts Arena, Auckland, New Zealand	
22	Win	20–1–1	(Japan) Shintaro Matsumoto	TKO	5 (12), 1:40	5 Jul 2013	ABA Stadium, Auckland, New Zealand	Won vacant WBC-ABC light heavyweight title
21	Win	19–1–1	(Australia) Serge Yannick	TKO	8 (10), 1:25	18 Apr 2013	Croatian Club, Melbourne, Australia	
20	Win	18–1–1	(New Zealand) Moses Ioelu	TKO	3 (4)	28 Mar 2013	ABA Stadium, Auckland, New Zealand	Won vacant NZPBA light heavyweight title
19	Win	17–1–1	(Samoa) Peter Tovi'o	TKO	3 (4)	20 Dec 2012	ABA Stadium, Auckland, New Zealand	
18	Win	16–1–1	(Australia) Joel Casey	TKO	2 (8), 1:09	5 Oct 2012	Croatian Club, Melbourne, Australia	
17	Loss	15–1–1	(Australia) Blake Caparello	UD	10	18 May 2012	Melbourne Pavilion, Melbourne, Australia	
16	Win	15–0–1	(Samoa) Peter Tovi'o	TKO	1 (4), 2:59	20 Apr 2012	The Corporate Box, Auckland, New Zealand	
15	Win	14–0–1	(Thailand) Dechapon Suwunnalird	UD	6	31 Mar 2012	ASB Stadium, Auckland, New Zealand	
14	Win	13–0–1	(Samoa) Faimasasa Tavu'i	TKO	4 (6), 1:04	8 Feb 2012	Claudelands Arena, Hamilton, New Zealand	
13	Win	12–0–1	(Australia) Trent Broadhurst	KO	5 (8), 2:59	28 Oct 2011	Mansfield Tavern, Brisbane, Australia	
12	Win	11–0–1	(Samoa) Peter Tovi'o	TKO	2 (4), 1:12	25 Aug 2011	Takapuna Rugby Football Club, Auckland, New Zealand	
11	Draw	10–0–1	(Australia) Kerry Foley	MD	6	20 Jul 2011	Entertainment Centre, Sydney, Australia	
10	Win	10–0	(New Zealand) Moses Ioelu	DQ	2 (4), 1:30	17 Jun 2011	ABA Stadium, Auckland, New Zealand	
9	Win	9–0	(New Zealand) Fale Siaoloa	TKO	4 (4)	28 May 2011	ABA Stadium, Auckland, New Zealand	
8	Win	8–0	(New Zealand) Fale Siaoloa	UD	6	26 Feb 2011	ABA Stadium, Auckland, New Zealand	
7	Win	7–0	(New Zealand) Roman Hunt	TKO	2 (6), 2:59	30 Oct 2010	ASB Stadium, Auckland, New Zealand	
6	Win	6–0	(New Zealand) Moses Ioelu	TKO	1 (6), 0:27	27 Aug 2010	ABA Stadium, Auckland, New Zealand	
5	Win	5–0	(New Zealand) Monty Filimaea	KO	2 (6)	21 May 2010	Northcote Birkenhead Rugby Club, Auckland, New Zealand	
4	Win	4–0	(Australia) Areta Gilbert	TKO	3 (6), 2:43	31 Mar 2010	The Trusts Arena, Auckland, New Zealand	
3	Win	3–0	(Samoa) Faimasasa Tavu'i	UD	6	31 Jul 2009	Northcote Birkenhead Rugby Club, Auckland, New Zealand	
2	Win	2–0	(New Zealand) Jamie Waru	KO	2 (4), 1:10	6 Jun 2009	Lagoon Stadium, Auckland, New Zealand	
1	Win	1–0	(New Zealand) Royden Lee	TKO	1 (4), 1:52	23 Apr 2009	ABA Stadium, Auckland, New Zealand	

Vacant	NZPBA Light Heavyweight; Title; 28 March 2013 – 3 June 2017	Vacant
Vacant Title last held by Sergey Kovalev; Stripped	WBC ABC Light Heavyweight; Title; 5 July 2013 – 5 July 2015	Vacant
Vacant Title last held by Blake Caparello; Stripped	PABA Light Heavyweight; Title; 16 November 2013 – 9 August 2014	Succeeded by Vasily Lepikhin
Vacant Title last held by Daniel MacKinnon; Stripped	WBO Oriental Light Heavyweight; Title; 16 November 2013 – 9 August 2014	Succeeded by Vasily Lepikhin
Vacant	IBO Oceania Light Heavyweight; Title; 25 April 2015 – 25 April 2016	Vacant
