= Frank LoPorto =

Australian boxer

Personal information
- Nationality: Australian
- Born: Frank LoPorto; 7 February 1978 (age 48) Brunswick, Victoria
- Height: 1.78 m (5 ft 10 in)
- Weight: Light middleweight

Boxing career
- Reach: 70 in (180 cm)
- Stance: Orthodox

Boxing record
- Total fights: 22
- Wins: 15
- Win by KO: 7
- Losses: 5
- Draws: 2
- No contests: 0

Frank LoPorto (born 7 February 1978) is an Australian former professional boxer who once held the PABA Super Welterweight Champion. He also challenged once for the WBA (Regular) light middleweight title in 2011.

== Professional record ==
Record to Date
Won 14 (KOs 6)	Lost 5	Drawn 2	Total 20

Date	Opponent	Location	Result
2011-11-11	Austin Trout	Cohen Stadium El Paso, Texas, United States	LOSS TKO- 6
2011-02-18	Harry Venka	Flemington Racecourse, Victoria, Australia, Australia	WIN TKO- 4
2010-10-09	Daniel Dawson	Arena Joondalup, Western Australia, Australia, Australia	WIN UD – 12
2009-10-03	Steve Heremaia	Mystery Creek Events Centre, New Zealand, New Zealand	LOSS UD – 6
2009-05-17	Jakkirt Suwunnalirt	Docklands Stadium, Melbourne, Victoria, Australia, Australia	WIN UD – 6
2009-04-26	Robbie Bryant	Challenge Stadium, Western Australia, Australia, Australia	WIN SD – 6
2008-10-17	Ray Musson	Campbelltown Catholic Club, Campbelltwon, New South Wales, Australia, Australia	WIN UD – 6
2008-07-19	Hendrik Aritonang	Docklands Stadium, Melbourne, Victoria, Australia, Australia	WIN TKO – 2
2008-06-27	Peter Mitrevski Jr	Campbelltown Catholic Club, Sydney, New South Wales, Australia, Australia	WIN UD – 10
2008-05-28	Sudesh Sharma	Hisense Arena, Melbourne, Victoria, Australia, Australia	WIN TKO – 1
2008-04-11	Lee Oti	Sky City Convention Centre, Auckland, New Zealand, New Zealand	DRAW PTS – 6
2007-12-14	King Davidson	, New South Wales, Australia, Australia	LOSS TD – 4
2007-10-12	Garry Comer	Penrith Stadium, Penrith, New South Wales, Australia, Australia	WIN TKO – 1
2007-06-26	Tim Hateley	Knox Basketball Stadium, Melbourne, Australia, Australia	WIN SD – 10
2006-11-24	Plaisakda Singwancha	Knox Basketball Stadium, Melbourne, Australia, Australia	WIN TKO – 4
2006-07-28	Paul Tapley	Knox Basketball Stadium, Melbourne, Australia, Australia	LOSS SD – 8
2006-05-26	Paul Tapley	Knox Basketball Stadium, Melbourne, Australia, Australia	WIN SD – 6
2006-03-24	Junior Talipeau	Blacktown RSL Club, Blacktown, New South Wales, Australia, Australia	LOSS UD – 4
2005-03-18	David Wiremu	Knox Basketball Stadium, Melbourne, Australia, Australia	WIN UD – 6
2003-10-17	Rafael Munoz	Knox Basketball Stadium, Melbourne, Australia, Australia	WIN TKO – 3
2003-07-25	Cameron Stevenson	Knox Basketball Stadium, Melbourne, Australia, Australia	DRAW TD – 2
