= Boxing NZ =

- Sport: Boxing
- Category: Amateur
- Jurisdiction: National
- Founded: 1924
- Affiliation: World Boxing
- Regional affiliation: Oceania Boxing Confederation
- Headquarters: Wellington, New Zealand
- President: Steve Hartley
- Board members: Steve Hartley(National Executive); John McKay(National Executive); Cathy Meehan(National Executive); Rachel Henry(National Executive); Vicky Jenkins(National Executive); Keith Walker(National Executive); Peter Leonard(Life Member); Martin Ryan(Life Member); Keith Walker(Life Member); Rex Jenkins(Life Member); Malcolm Nicol(Life Member); John McKay(Life Member); Neil Cadwallader(Insurance Fund Trustees); Martin Ryan(Insurance Fund Trustees); Graham Martin(Hon Medical Consultant); Michael Dineen(Hon Legal Adviser); Keith Walker(Treasurer); Paul Gueorgieff(Executive Assistant); Bob Lindberg(Accounts)
- Vice president: Bryan Usher
- Replaced: New Zealand Boxing Council
- (founded): 1902
- Closure date: 1924

Official website
- www.boxingnz.org.nz
- (New Zealand)

Boxing NZ inc (formerly known as New Zealand Boxing Association, also known as Boxing New Zealand) is New Zealand's leading amateur boxing organisation that was established in 1924.

== First boxing organisations ==
The first boxing fight that was recorded in New Zealand was in July 1862 in Canterbury between London boxer Harry Jones and local boxer George Barton. It lasted 70 minutes over 30 rounds of bare fisted boxing. A council was formed in 1902 called the New Zealand Boxing Council which was administrated in Christchurch. In 1924 the New Zealand Boxing Association (NZBA) took over as the country's boxing body as the previous body no longer found themselves adequately to control the sport. NZBA moved the headquarters to Wellington.

== Professional boxing ==
Between 1924 and the 2000s, the NZBA was the leading organisation in both amateur and professional boxing. With the introduction of different boxing organisations, Boxing NZ began to focus solely on amateur boxing. The first recorded New Zealand National professional boxing title was won in 1884 by Harry Laing. The first recorded boxing association champion was Hock Keys in 1905 and Carrie Blackburn in September 1924 after NZBA took over as the country's body. The last person to win the boxing title was Colin Hunia in 2004. But the last contest for the title was in 2006 between Guillermo Mosquera and David Wiremu which ended in a draw. This is all according to BoxRec. Boxing NZ has not commissioned a professional boxing bout since 2011, however they are legally allowed to do so if they wish to. However the days of the Pro-Am events were over when the rise of corporate boxing began and took over New Zealand's boxing industry.

== Women's boxing ==
NZBA was purely a male sport and was officiated only by male referees and judges. This changed in 1990 with Trish Howie becoming the first New Zealand boxing official in New Zealand. In 1996 the NZBA passed a rule to finally allow women to box in New Zealand. The first women's bout was held in 1997.

== Nationals and Golden Gloves ==
Boxing NZ holds an annual boxing competition to determine the New Zealand National Boxing Championship, which generally happens within the last quarter of the year. They also host three Golden Gloves events through the year, one for North Island, one for South Island, and finally a National Golden Gloves Championship. The Golden Gloves Championship are separate from the National and generally happen in the middle of the year. The championships first began in 1902.

== Local bodies ==
Boxing NZ has over 20 local bodies located across New Zealand to act on behalf of Boxing NZ. One of the most notable is the Auckland Boxing Association, where the majority of New Zealand Boxing events are held at the ABA Stadium.

- Auckland Boxing Association
- Bay Of Plenty Boxing Association
- Boxing Canterbury Metro Association
- Canterbury Boxing Association
- Central Hawkes Bay Boxing Association
- Central North Island Boxing Association
- Counties Manukau Boxing Association
- East Coast Boxing Association
- Hawkes Bay Boxing Association
- Kirikiriroa Boxing Association
- Manawatu Boxing Association
- Masterton and Districts Boxing Association
- Nelson Boxing Association
- Otago Boxing Association
- Shamrock Boxing Association
- South Auckland Boxing Association
- Southland Boxing Association
- Taranaki Boxing Association
- Timaru Boxing Association
- Waikato Amateur Boxing Association
- Wanganui Boxing Association
- Wellington Hutt Valley Boxing Association

== Open division for trans boxers ==
In April 2022, Rainbow Boxing New Zealand Closed down noting the lack of support for the LGBT+ community from Boxing NZ. Benjamin Thomas Watt who was the former President of Rainbow Boxing stated that Boxing NZ refused to create a division for transgender boxers, so that they can participate in their own division. The Rainbow Boxing President stated “was not ready to open its arms to the Rainbow Community.” Four months after the article, Boxing New Zealand created an "Open" division for Transgender boxers to compete in.
