= Venkatesan Harikrishnan =

New Zealand boxer

- Born: 4 July 1982 (age 44); India
- Other names: Harry Venka
- Nationality: New Zealander
- Height: 183 cm (6 ft 0 in)
- Weight: 170.25 lb (77 kg; 12 st 2 lb)
- Division: Middleweight
- Reach: 183 cm (72.0 in)
- Style: Boxing
- Stance: Orthodox
- Years active: 2006 - 2008, 2010 - 2013

Professional boxing record
- Total: 16
- Wins: 8
- By knockout: 1
- Losses: 7
- By knockout: 4
- Draws: 1

Amateur record
- Total: 95
- Wins: 75
- Losses: 20

Other information
- Boxing record from BoxRec
- Last updated on: 28 January 2017

Venkatesan Harikrishnan (born 4 July 1982), also known as Harry Venka, is a retired New Zealand professional boxer born in India.

Harikrishnan fought against Frank LoPorto in Australia in February 2011 for the WBA - PABA Super Welterweight title. Harikrishnan lost the bout by TKO.

Harikrishnan's last professional bout was against Gunnar Jackson, a New Zealand veteran and the New Zealand Champion at the time, in Tauranga, New Zealand. Harikrishnan has not fought since, though he has made no official announcement of his retirement.

== Professional boxing record ==
16 fights	8 wins	7 losses
By knockout	1	4
By decision	7	3
Draws	1	

No.	Result	Record	Opponent	Type	Round, time	Date	Location	Notes
16	Lose	8–7–1	(New Zealand) Gunnar Jackson	UD	6	9 Nov 2013	TGA Stadium, Tauranga, New Zealand	
15	Lose	8–6–1	(Australia) Wes Capper	TKO	3 (6)	9 Nov 2012	WA Italian Club, Perth, Western Australia, Australia	
14	Lose	8–5–1	(Australia) Eddie Delic	UD	8	1 Apr 2011	Town Hall, Malvern, Victoria, Australia	
13	Lose	8–4–1	(Australia) Frank LoPorto	TKO	4 (12) 2:44	18 Feb 2011	Racecourse - Atrium Room, Flemington, Victoria, Australia	For WBA - PABA super welterweight title
12	Draw	8–3–1	(New Zealand) Steve Heremaia	MD	8	21 Aug 2010	Panmure Lagoon Stadium, Panmure, New Zealand	For vacant Auckland light middleweight title
11	Win	8–3	(New Zealand) Steve Heremaia	SD	4	31 Jan 2010	ABA Stadium, Auckland, New Zealand	
10	Lose	7–3	(Australia) Jason Hartmann	TKO	2 (6) 2:23	28 Nov 2008	Mansfield Tavern, Mansfield, Queensland, Australia	
9	Lose	7–2	(Australia) Robert Medley	TKO	2 (6) 1:53	17 Oct 2008	The Cube, Campbelltown, Sydney, New South Wales, Australia	
8	Win	7–1	(New Zealand) Jamie Waru	KO	6	28 Jun 2008	TSB Bank Arena, Wellington, New Zealand	
7	Win	6–1	(Australia) Paz Viejo	UD	4	27 Mar 2008	ABA Stadium, Auckland, New Zealand	
6	Win	5–1	(New Zealand) Fale Siaoloa	UD	4	28 Sep 2007	Manurewa Netball Centre, Manurewa, New Zealand	
5	Win	4–1	(New Zealand) Dion McNabney	UD	4	28 Jun 2007	The Trusts Arena, Auckland, New Zealand	
4	Lose	3–1	(New Zealand) Robbie Bryant	SD	4	28 Apr 2007	Lords Sports Club, Subiaco, Perth, Western Australia, Australia	
3	Win	3–0	(New Zealand) Sean Unwin	KO	1 (6)	1 Dec 2006	Cowles Stadium, Christchurch, New Zealand	
2	Win	2–0	(New Zealand) Sam Faleti	UD	4	11 Nov 2006	Vodafone Events Centre, Manukau, New Zealand	
1	Win	1–0	(New Zealand) Sam Faleti	UD	4	22 Sept 2006	ABA Stadium, Auckland, New Zealand	
