= Daniel MacKinnon (boxer) =

New Zealand boxer

Personal information
- Nickname: The King
- Nationality: New Zealander
- Born: 1 September 1983 (age 43) Otorohanga, New Zealand
- Height: 176 cm (5 ft 9 in)
- Weight: Light Heavyweight

Boxing career
- Reach: 175 cm (69 in)
- Stance: Orthodox

Boxing record
- Total fights: 30
- Wins: 21
- Win by KO: 9
- Losses: 8
- Draws: 1

Daniel MacKinnon (born 1 September 1983) is a retired New Zealand professional boxer. MacKinnon has entered the WBO top 15 rankings multiple times, peaking at #12 in the Super Middleweight Division in November 2008 and #12 in the Light Heavyweight Division August 2013.

== Australian contender ==
MacKinnon took part in The Contender Australia, a reality television show based on the sport of boxing. The show practically was a fourteen-man tournament with boxers hailing from Australia and New Zealand. MacKinnon won his first bout against Luke Moloney which put him into the quarter finals. Unfortunately Mackinnon lost against Josh Clenshaw by Majority Decision.

== MacKinnon vs Berridge ==
MacKinnion fought Robert Berridge for the vacant WBO Oriental and WBA PABA Light Heavyweight titles. This fight was the highest ranked fight between two New Zealander's in the Light Heavyweight division in New Zealand History. Unfortunately lost by TKO in the tenth round. MacKinnon was rushed to hospital after the fight. After a CT scan it was discovered that MacKinnon had a brain bleed and had emergency surgery. MacKinnon was in a coma however woke up less than 24 hours after the surgery. MacKinnon made a fully recover however his boxing career is over.

== Professional boxing titles ==
- World Boxing Organisation
  - WBO Oriental light heavyweight title (2013)
  - WBO Oriental super middleweight title (2007)
- New Zealand National Boxing Federation
  - New Zealand National middleweight title (2005)

== Professional boxing record ==
30 fights	21 wins	8 losses
By knockout	12	3
By decision	9	5
Draws	1	

Res.	Record	Opponent	Type	Rd., Time	Date	Location	Notes
Lose	21–8–1	(New Zealand) Robert Berridge	TKO	10, (12) 2:51	2013-11-16	Claudelands Arena, Hamilton, New Zealand	For vacant WBA - PABA and WBO Oriental light heavyweight titles
Lose	21–7–1	(Australia) Blake Caparello	MD	12	2013-07-25	The Melbourne Pavilion, Flemington, Australia	WBA - PABA light heavyweight title
Win	21–6–1	(Australia) Mark Flanagan	SD	12	2013-02-28	Greek Club, Brisbane, Australia	WBO Oriental light heavyweight title
Win	20–6–1	(Samoa) Faimasasa Tavu'i	RTD	1, (8) 3:00	2012-07-05	Sky City Convention Centre, Auckland, New Zealand	
Lose	19–6–1	(New Zealand) Soulan Pownceby	TD	7, (12) 1:15	2012-06-01	ABA Stadium, Auckland, New Zealand	WBO Asia Pacific light heavyweight title
Win	19–5–1	(Pakistan) (New Zealand) Fale Siaoloa	UD	6	2011-08-13	TelstraClear Pacific Events Centre, Manukau City, New Zealand	
Win	18–5–1	(New Zealand) Fale Siaoloa	UD	4	2010-08-21	Panmure Lagoon Stadium, Auckland, New Zealand	
Win	17–5–1	(Samoa) Ioane Talamauga	UD	4	2010-06-17	ABA Stadium, Auckland, New Zealand	
Win	16–5–1	(Samoa) Ioane Talamauga	UD	4	2010-06-04	Manurewa Netball Centre, Manurewa, New Zealand	
Win	15–5–1	(New Zealand) Fale Siaoloa	UD	4	2010-01-31	ABA Stadium, Auckland, New Zealand	
Lose	14–5–1	(Australia) Josh Clenshaw	MD	5	2009-09-25	Sydney Olympic Park, Homebush, Australia	Australian Contender Super Middleweight Series Quarter Finals
Win	14–4–1	(Australia) Luke Moloney	KO	3 ,(5) 1:22	2009-08-17	Sydney Olympic Park, Homebush, Australia	Australian Contender Super Middleweight Series
Win	13–4–1	(New Zealand) Fale Siaoloa	TKO	6 ,(8) 2:40	2009-03-28	Te Awamutu, New Zealand	
Loss	12–4–1	(Australia) Daniel Geale	UD	10	2008-12-05	The Cube, Campbelltown, Sydney, Australia	
Win	12–3–1	(New Zealand) Shane Chapman	UD	12	2008-05-03	Headhunters Motorcycle Club, Ellerslie, New Zealand	WBO Oriental super middleweight title
Win	11–3–1	(Samoa) (New Zealand) Niusila Seiuli	UD	6	2008-03-27	ABA Stadium, Auckland, New Zealand	
Win	10–3–1	(Australia) Kerey Palmer	TKO	3, (12)	2007-12-15	ABA Stadium, Auckland, New Zealand	Won vacant WBO Oriental super middleweight title
Win	9–3–1	(Samoa) (New Zealand) Niusila Seiuli	UD	6	2007-10-27	ABA Stadium, Auckland, New Zealand	
Win	8–3–1	(Samoa) (New Zealand) Rico Chong Nee	SD	6	2007-07-14	ASB Stadium, Kohimarama, New Zealand	
Win	7–3–1	(Australia) Jonny Walker	TKO	4, (6) 0:37	2007-06-29	Town Hall, Malvern, Australia	
Win	6–3–1	(New Zealand) Fale Siaoloa	UD	6	2007-06-04	Manurewa Netball Centre, Manurewa, New Zealand	
Lose	5–3–1	(Cameroon) (Australia) Charles Njock	UD	6	2006-11-17	Sky City Convention Centre, Auckland, New Zealand	
Win	5–2–1	(Samoa) (New Zealand) Fili Mailata	TKO	7, (12)	2005-12-10	ABA Stadium, Auckland, New Zealand	Won vacant New Zealand National Boxing Federation middleweight title
Win	4–2–1	(New Zealand) Chris Rehu	TKO	3, (6)	2005-11-24	ABA Stadium, Auckland, New Zealand	
Win	3–2–1	(New Zealand) Tapanuu Tagilimai	TKO	1, (6) 0:26	2005-10-27	ABA Stadium, Auckland, New Zealand	
Win	2–2–1	(New Zealand) Craig Parsons	KO	1, (4)	2005-09-29	ABA Stadium, Auckland, New Zealand	
Lose	1–2–1	(Australia) Peter Kazzi	KO	2, (6) 0:40	2005-09-07	Institute of Sports Stadium, Canberra, Australia	
Draw	1–1–1	(Samoa) (New Zealand) Fili Mailata	PTS	4	2004-05-27	ABA Stadium, Auckland, New Zealand	
Win	1–1	(Vanuatu) Kali Jacobus	TKO	3,(6)	2004-04-29	ABA Stadium, Auckland, New Zealand	
Win	1–0	(Samoa) (New Zealand) Fili Mailata	PTS	3	2003-11-27	ABA Stadium, Auckland, New Zealand	
