= Reece Papuni =

New Zealand boxer (born 1987)

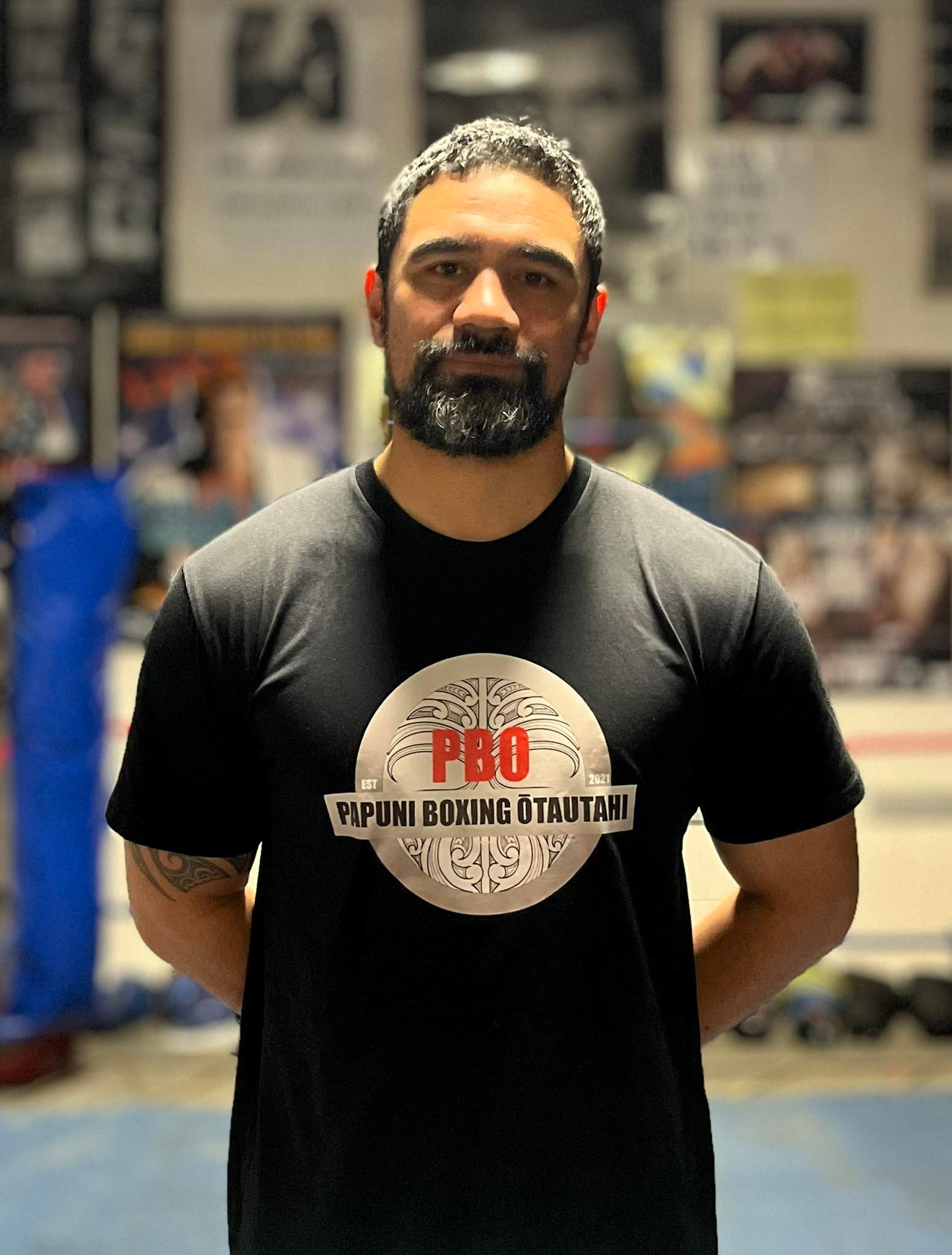
- Born: 2 October 1987 (age 39); Christchurch, New Zealand
- Nationality: New Zealand
- Height: 1.79 m (5 ft 10 in)
- Weight: 77 kg (170 lb; 12 st 2 lb)
- Division: Light Heavyweight
- Reach: 185 cm (72.8 in)
- Stance: Orthodox
- Years active: 2012–present

Professional boxing record
- Total: 17
- Wins: 14
- By knockout: 7
- Losses: 3
- By knockout: 3
- Draws: 0

Other information
- Boxing record from BoxRec
- Last updated on: 28 January 2017

Reece Papuni (born 2 October 1987) is a New Zealand professional boxer. As an amateur, he reached the quarterfinals of the 2010 Commonwealth Games.

Papuni is a former New Zealand national Light Heavyweight champion when he defeated Sam Rapira for the title in October 2014. Papuni is a professional athlete and a trained boxing trainer, Phil Shatford.

== Amateur career ==
During his amateur career, Papuni got to fight on a David Tua undercard as an amateur when Papuni took on Tyson Sykes on the Tua vs Barrett II fight card. Papuni was considered very hopeful to go to the 2012 olympics.

== Professional boxing career ==
=== Early professional career ===
In 2013, Papuni took on Scott Taliauli at the Wilding Park. Papuni won the fight by third round stoppage. In April 2014, Papuni took on MMA fighter Eddie Lenart. Papuni stated he did not know his opponent. Papuni won the fight by sixth round stoppage.

=== Papuni vs Rapira ===
In October 2014, Papuni took on one of his biggest rivals of his careers, Sam Rapira for the New Zealand national (NZNBF version) Light Heavyweight title on a Joseph Parker undercard, promoted by Duco Events. Rapira was the defending champion. The two has fought multiple times during their amateurs career. Papuni won the fight by stoppage in the fourth round, one of his biggest wins of his career.

=== WBA Regional title fight, Christchurch return ===
Papuni was originally scheduled to fight on another Joseph Parker undercard with Duco events in March 2015, however, the fight did not go ahead. In June 2015, Papuni took on Trent Broadhurst for the vacant WBA Oceania Light Heavyweight title. Papuni took this big risk in hopes to reach the top 15 in the WBA. Unfortunately, Papuni lost the fight by fifth round stoppage, first loss of his professional career. In September 2019, Papuni took on Samoan boxer Tony Iapesa at Horncastle Arena in Christchurch. Papuni won the fight by fifth round stoppage. The event raised $183,000 for charity.

=== Super 8 Four Man Tournament ===
In early November 2015, Papuni Took part in the Four man Tournament. Papuni joined Robert Berridge, Sefo Falekaono and Brad Riddell in the tournament. Papuni Won the Tournament, winning against Brad Riddell and Robert Berridge.

=== Hometown return, Australasian title, retirement ===
In March 2016, Papuni took on Joshua Tai at the Addington Raceway. Papuni won the fight by Majority Decision. Papuni at the time contemplated moving to Australia to improve his career. In September 2016, Papuni took on Faris Chevalier for the ANBF Australasian Super Middleweight title. Papuni lost the fight by ninth round stoppage.

After three years from being away from the ring, Papuni took on Blake Caparello for the WBA Oceania Light Heavyweight title. Caparello won the fight by eighth round stoppage. In November 2019, Papuni returned to the ring when he took on Alex Tzinavos in Nelson. Papuni won the fight by Unanimous Decision, giving him his first win in over three years.

== Amateur boxing titles ==
- 2003 New Zealand Amateur Champion (Junior 81 kg)
- 2009 New Zealand Amateur 81 kg Champion
- 2010 Jameson Belt (Most scientific senior male) 76th Winner
- 2010 New Zealand Amateur 81 kg Champion
- 2011 New Zealand Amateur 81 kg Champion

== Professional boxing titles ==
- Tournament
  - Super Eight Boxing Tournament Winner (2015)
- World Boxing Federation
  - WBF Oceania light heavyweight title (2013)
- New Zealand National Boxing Federation
  - New Zealand National light heavyweight title(2014)

== Professional boxing record ==
17 fights	14 wins	3 losses
By knockout	7	3
By decision	7	0
Draws	0	

Res.	Record	Opponent	Type	Rd., Time	Date	Location	Notes
Win	14–3	(New Zealand) Alex Tzinavos	UD	6	2019-11-9	Trafalgar Centre, Nelson, New Zealand	
Lose	13–3	(Australia) Blake Caparello	TKO	8, (10)	2019-08-9	The Melbourne Pavilion, Flemington, Victoria, Australia	For WBA Oceania light heavyweight title
Lose	13–2	(Australia) Faris Chevalier	TKO	9, (10) 2:20	2016-09-10	Mansfield Tavern, Mansfield, Queensland, Australia	For vacant Australasian super middleweight title
Win	13–1	(New Zealand) Joshua Tai	MD	8	2016-03-05	Addington Raceway, Christchurch, New Zealand	
Win	12–1	(New Zealand) Robert Berridge	SD	4, (3)	2015-11-03	SkyCity Convention Centre, Auckland, New Zealand	Super 8 Four Man Light Heavyweight Tournament Final; Original result ended in a draw so it went to an extra round.
Win	11–1	(New Zealand) Brad Riddell	UD	4, (3)	2015-11-03	SkyCity Convention Centre, Auckland, New Zealand	Super 8 Four Man Light Heavyweight Tournament Semi-Final; Original result ended in a draw so it went to an extra round.
Win	10–1	(Samoa) Tony Iapesa	TKO	5, (8)	2015-09-12	Horncastle Arena, Christchurch, New Zealand	
Loss	9–1	(Australia) Trent Broadhurst	TKO	5, (10) 2:19	2015-06-19	Brisbane Convention Centre, Brisbane, Australia	For vacant WBA Oceania light heavyweight title
Win	9–0	(New Zealand) Mike Junior Kapi	KO	2, (8) 0:37	2014-11-22	Horncastle Arena, Christchurch, New Zealand	
Win	8–0	(New Zealand) Sam Rapira	TKO	4, (10)	2014-10-16	The Trusts Arena, Auckland, New Zealand	Won NZNBF light heavyweight title
Win	7–0	(New Zealand) Eddie Lenart	TKO	6, (6)	2014-04-04	Cathedral Square, Christchurch, New Zealand	
Win	6–0	(New Zealand) Avefu'a Iakopo Jnr	TKO	1, 6 2:53	2014-02-28	Hornby Working Men's Club, Christchurch, New Zealand	
Win	5–0	(Tonga) (New Zealand) Scott Taliauli	TKO	3, 6	2013-11-01	Wilding Park, Christchurch, New Zealand	
Win	4–0	(New Zealand) Andrew Robinson	UD	10	2013-07-20	Roy Stokes Hall, Christchurch, New Zealand	Won vacant World Boxing Federation Oceania light heavyweight title
Win	3–0	(New Zealand) Ritchie Harris	TKO	1, (6) 2:15	2013-02-28	Hornby Working Men's Club, Christchurch, New Zealand	
Win	2–0	(New Zealand) Jacques Marsters	UD	6	2012-09-06	Hornby Working Men's Club, Christchurch, New Zealand	
Win	1–0	(New Zealand) John Roil	UD	6	2012-04-12	Hornby Working Men's Club, Christchurch, New Zealand	

== Personal life ==
Papuni is Māori with ancestry of Ngā Rauru, Ngāi Tahu, and Ngāti Porou.

== Awards and recognitions ==
- 2019 Gladrap Boxing Awards Returning Boxer of the year (Nominated)

Vacant	WBF Oceania Light Heavyweight; Title; 20 July 2013 – 20 July 2014	Vacant
Preceded by Sam Rapira	NZNBF Light Heavyweight; Title; 16 October 2014 – Present	Incumbent
