= Robbie Bryant =

New Zealand boxer

- Born: 1 March 1979 (age 47); Masterton, New Zealand
- Nationality: New Zealander; Australian
- Height: 173 cm (5 ft 8 in)
- Weight: 161.5 lb (73 kg; 11 st 8 lb)
- Division: Middleweight
- Reach: 180 cm (70.9 in)
- Style: Boxing
- Stance: Orthodox
- Years active: 2006–present

Professional boxing record
- Total: 25
- Wins: 20
- By knockout: 8
- Losses: 4
- By knockout: 1
- Draws: 1

Other information
- Notable relatives: Lance Bryant (Brother)
- Boxing record from BoxRec
- Last updated on: 28 January 2017

Robbie Bryant (born 1 March 1979, Masterton, New Zealand) is professional boxer.

Bryant has achieved allot in his boxing career, including winning multiple title in the Amateurs, hold a regional title from IBF & WBA and Peaking as high as 8 in the WBA World rankings in the Middleweight division.

Bryant has three other brothers in his family, including IBO Asia Pacific, WBFed Oceania and New Zealand National (NZNBF Version) Cruiserweight Champion Lance Bryant. In 1995, all four brothers won a New Zealand Amateur National Title's in the Junior and Intermediate Division. In 2016, both Lance and Robbie got to fight on the same card for the first time as professionals in their hometown.

== Amateur boxing titles ==
- 1994 New Zealand Amateur Featherweight Champion (Junior Division)
- 1995 New Zealand Amateur Lightweight Champion (Intermediate Division)
- 1996 New Zealand Amateur Light Welterweight Champion (Intermediate Division)

== Professional boxing titles ==
- Australian Western Australia State
  - Australia – West Australia State middleweight title (159¼ Ibs)
- World Boxing Association
  - PABA middleweight title (159½ Ibs)
- International Boxing Federation
  - IBF Australasian middleweight title (159½ Ibs)

== Professional boxing record ==
25 fights	20 wins	4 losses
By knockout	8	1
By decision	12	3
Draws	1	

No.	Result	Record	Opponent	Type	Round, time	Date	Location	Notes
25	Win	20–4–1	(New Zealand) Daniel Maxwell	UD	6	28 May 2016	Bush Multisport Stadium, Pahiatua, New Zealand	
24	Win	19–4–1	(Thailand) Yuttana Wongda	SD	6	28 August 2015	WA Italian Club, Perth, Western Australia, Australia	
23	Lose	18–4–1	(Australia) Dean Mikelj	TKO	6 (8) 2:01	19 July 2014	WA Italian Club, Perth, Western Australia, Australia	
22	Lose	18–3–1	(Republic of Ireland) Dennis Hogan	UD	6 (8)	7 December 2013	Kingsway Indoor Stadium, Madeley, Western Australia, Australia	Australian middleweight title
21	Win	18–2–1	(Thailand) Suwicha Ratidet	UD	8	20 September 2013	WA Italian Club, Perth, Western Australia, Australia	
20	Lose	17–2–1	(Australia) Jarrod Fletcher	UD	12	16 December 2012	WA Italian Club, Perth, Western Australia, Australia	WBA – PABA middleweight title
19	Win	17–1–1	(Indonesia) Jonatan Simamora	TKO	7 (8)	17 August 2012	WA Italian Club, Perth, Western Australia, Australia	
18	Win	16–1–1	(Philippines) Arnel Tinampay	UD	12	20 April 2012	WA Italian Club, Perth, Western Australia, Australia	WBA – PABA & IBF Australasian middleweight titles
17	Win	15–1–1	(Australia) Les Piper	SD	12	23 July 2011	WA Italian Club, Perth, Western Australia, Australia	WBA – PABA & vacant IBF Australasian middleweight titles
16	Win	14–1–1	(Samoa) Togasilimai Letoa	UD	12	12 March 2011	WA Italian Club, Perth, Western Australia, Australia	vacant WBA – PABA middleweight title
15	Win	13–1–1	(Republic of the Congo) Sonni Michael Angelo	UD	8	12 December 2010	WA Italian Club, Perth, Western Australia, Australia	
14	Win	12–1–1	(Fiji) Edwin Samy	UD	4	30 October 2010	Curtin Stadium, Bently, Western Australia, Australia	
13	Win	11–1–1	(Australia) Jeremy Allan	TKO	2 (10) 1:40	9 October 2010	Joondalup Arena, Joondalup, Western Australia, Australia	vacant Australia – West Australia State middleweight title
12	Win	10–1–1	(Australia) William Hadlow	TKO	5 (6) 1:19	21 August 2010	Curtin Stadium, Wembley, Perth, Western Australia, Australia	
11	Win	9–1–1	(New Zealand) Dion McNabney	KO	2 (6) 2:53	22 May 2010	WA Italian Club, Perth, Western Australia, Australia	
10	Win	8–1–1	(Philippines) Jurland Ceniza	KO	6	3 October 2009	Swan United Soccer Club, Midland, Western Australia, Australia	
9	Lose	7–1–1	(Australia) Frank LoPorto	SD	6	26 April 2009	Challenge Stadium, Perth, Western Australia, Australia	
8	Win	7–0–1	(Thailand) Jakkirt Suwunnalirt	KO	4 (6) 2:43	1 February 2009	WA Italian Club, Perth, Western Australia, Australia	
7	Win	6–0–1	(Thailand) Chokchana Sithkrupon	KO	1 (6) 1:49	15 June 2008	WA Italian Club, Perth, Western Australia, Australia	
6	Win	5–0–1	(Thailand) Kiattisak Kuarwan	TKO	3 (6) 2:16	16 March 2008	WA Italian Club, Perth, Western Australia, Australia	
5	Win	4–0–1	(Indonesia) Andreas Seran	SD	4	18 July 2007	Challenge Stadium, Perth, Western Australia, Australia	
4	Draw	3–0–1	(Thailand) Chalermchai Takulchana	TD	2 (4) 0:55	23 June 2007	WA Italian Club, Perth, Western Australia, Australia	
3	Win	3–0	(India) Venkatesan Harikrishnan	SD	4	28 April 2007	Lords Sports Club, Subiaco, Perth, Western Australia, Australia	
2	Win	2–0	(Fiji) Abhay Chand	TKO	3 (4) 1:46	24 March 2007	Herb Graham Rec & Fit Centre, Mirrabooka, Perth, Western Australia, Australia	
1	Win	1–0	(Papua New Guinea) Tyrone Tongia	UD	4	20 September 2006	Challenge Stadium, Perth, Western Australia, Australia	Professional debut
