= Rohan Murdock =

Australian boxer

Personal information
- Nationality: Australian
- Born: 27 February 1992 (age 34) Perth, Western Australia, Australia
- Height: 1.83 m (6 ft 0 in)
- Weight: Super-middleweight

Boxing career
- Reach: 183 cm (72 in)
- Stance: Orthodox

Boxing record
- Total fights: 30
- Wins: 27
- Win by KO: 19
- Losses: 3

Rohan Murdock (born 27 February 1992) is an Australian professional boxer.

== Personal life ==
Murdock was born in Perth but moved to the Gold Coast at a young age.

== Professional boxing career ==
Murdock made his professional debut in his hometown of the Gold Coast, Australia on 4 December 2010 defeating John Noctor via first-round knockout (KO). He suffered his first and only loss against Steven Moxon via majority decision (MD) on 6 March 2011. Since the loss, he has compiled 19 consecutive victories with 12 KOs. He is scheduled to fight Frankie Filippone on 3 February 2018 in Corpus Christi, Texas. Should Murdock win, there are plans in place to host WBO champion Gilberto Ramirez in his hometown of the Gold Coast in a bout to take place on the beach.

== Professional boxing record ==
30 fights	27 wins	3 losses
By knockout	19	2
By decision	8	1

No.	Result	Record	Opponent	Type	Round	Date	Location	Notes
30	Loss	27–3	Christian M'billi	RTD	6 (10), 3:00	13 Jan 2024	Videotron Centre, Quebec City, Canada	WBC Continental Americas and WBA International super middleweight titles
29	Win	27–2	Isaac Hardman	SD	10	12 Mar 2023	Qudos Bank Arena, Sydney Olympic Park, Sydney, Australia	Won vacant IBF Australasian super middleweight title
28	Win	26–2	Alongkorn Borisut	TKO	2 (6), 0:33	17 Sep 2022	Singmanassak Muaythai School, Pathum Thani, Thailand	
27	Win	25–2	Les Sherrington	KO	3 (8), 2:15	19 Jun 2021	Nissan Arena, Nathan, Australia	3 knockdown rule invoked; Sherrington down 3 times in round 3
26	Loss	24–2	Zach Parker	TKO	11 (12), 2:58	7 Mar 2020	Manchester Arena, Manchester, England	For WBO Inter-Continental super-middleweight title
25	Win	24–1	Rolando Wenceslao Mansilla	UD	10	15 Dec 2018	Brisbane Convention & Exhibition Centre, Brisbane, Australia	Won vacant WBO Oriental super-middleweight title
24	Win	23–1	Pablo Daniel Zamora Nievas	TKO	4 (8), 1:54	15 Sep 2018	Pullman and Mercure, Brisbane, Australia	
23	Win	22–1	Frankie Filippone	RTD	4 (8), 3:00	3 Feb 2018	American Bank Center, Corpus Christi, Texas, US	
22	Win	21–1	Apti Ustarkhanov	UD	10	13 Dec 2017	Brisbane Convention & Exhibition Centre, Brisbane, Australia	Won vacant WBO Oriental super-middleweight title
21	Win	20–1	Said Mbelwa	TKO	3 (8), 2:36	14 Oct 2017	Brisbane Convention & Exhibition Centre, Brisbane, Australia	
20	Win	19–1	Damian Ezequiel Bonelli	UD	10	21 Oct 2016	Sleeman Sports Complex, Brisbane, Australia	
19	Win	18–1	Jorge Daniel Caraballo	UD	10	28 Aug 2015	WA Italian Club, Perth, Australia	Retained WBO Asia Pacific super-middleweight title
18	Win	17–1	Francisco Ramon Benitez	KO	2 (10), 0:21	8 May 2015	WA Italian Club, Perth, Australia	Retained WBO Asia Pacific super-middleweight title
17	Win	16–1	Manny Siaca	RTD	6 (10), 3:00	6 Nov 2014	Jupiters Hotel & Casino, Gold Coast, Australia	Won WBO Asia Pacific super-middleweight title
16	Win	15–1	Gaston Alejandro Vega	KO	5 (10), 2:46	30 Jul 2014	Jupiters Hotel & Casino, Gold Coast, Australia	
15	Win	14–1	Jody Allen	KO	1 (8), 2:44	17 May 2014	PCYC Nerang, Gold Coast, Australia]	
14	Win	13–1	Les Piper	TKO	2 (6), 2:52	22 Nov 2013	PCYC Nerang, Gold Coast, Australia	
13	Win	12–1	Togasilimai Letoa	MD	6	20 Sep 2013	Southport Sharks AFL Club, Gold Coast, Australia	
12	Win	11–1	Les Piper	KO	10 (10), 0:51	12 Jul 2013	Southport Sharks AFL Club, Gold Coast, Australia	
11	Win	10–1	Afakasi Faumui	KO	3 (10), 0:58	2 Mar 2013	Matrix Boxing Gym, Gold Coast, Australia	Won WBO Asia Pacific Youth super-middleweight title
10	Win	9–1	Dechapon Suwunnalird	TKO	5 (10), 1:41	8 Dec 2012	Matrix Boxing Gym, Gold Coast, Australia	
9	Win	8–1	Moses Ioelu	TKO	1 (6), 2:58	14 Oct 2012	Turf Club, Gold Coast, Australia	
8	Win	7–1	Jeremy Allan	UD	6	13 Jul 2012	Matrix Boxing Gym, Gold Coast, Australia	
7	Win	6–1	Kashif Mumtaz	TKO	1 (6), 2:08	26 May 2012	Jupiters Hotel & Casino, Gold Coast, Australia	
6	Win	5–1	Joel Bourke	UD	6	16 Dec 2011	Southport RSL Club, Gold Coast, Australia	
5	Win	4–1	Peter Tovi'o	TKO	1 (4), 2:50	7 Oct 2011	QT Gold Coast Hotel, Gold Coast, Australia	
4	Win	3–1	Philip Robertson	TKO	1 (4), 2:13	24 Jun 2011	Southport Sharks AFL Club, Gold Coast, Australia	
3	Loss	2–1	Steve Moxon	MD	4	3 Jun 2011	Greek Club, Brisbane, Australia	
2	Win	2–0	Ben Dyer	KO	1 (4), 0:48	13 Apr 2011	Brisbane Entertainment Centre, Brisbane, Australia	
1	Win	1–0	John Noctor	KO	1 (4), 1:02	4 Dec 2010	Gold Coast Convention and Exhibition Centre, Gold Coast, Australia	
