= Adrian Taihia =

New Zealand boxer

Personal information
- Nickname: The Terrah
- Nationality: New Zealander
- Born: Adrian Taihia; 3 September 1983 (age 43) Auckland, New Zealand
- Weight: Light Heavyweight

Boxing career
- Stance: Orthodox

Boxing record
- Total fights: 22
- Wins: 15
- Win by KO: 7
- Losses: 5
- Draws: 2

Adrian Taihia (born 3 September 1983) is a retired New Zealand professional boxer. Taihia is in Craig Thomson's Boxing Stable.

== Australian Contender ==
Taihia took part in The Contender Australia, a reality television show based on the sport of boxing. The show practically was a fourteen-man tournament with boxers hailing from Australia and New Zealand. Unfortunately Taihia didn't make it through to the next round.

== Taihia vs Jackson ==
Taihia has fought Gunnar Jackson twice in their professional boxing career. Both boxers are under the same boxing stable, which is owned by Craig Thomson. Both bouts were for the NZPBA Super Middleweight title. The first bout ended in a Majority Decision Draw with two judges in favour of a draw and the last judge in favour of Jackson. The second bout Taihia won the title by Unanimous Decision. The vacant World Boxing Federation Oceania title was also on the line.

== Berridge rivalry ==
Taihia has had a long rivalry with Robert Berridge. Both fights started their boxing career around the same time as each other and both have climbed the ranks. It has been dubbed by the New Zealand public a dream fight in the light heavyweight division. Taihia has agreed to fight Berridge multiple times, however Berridge has always pulled out, either due to injury or promoter negotiation issues. The rivalry got even more person when Taihia entered the ring during a Berridge post fight interview. The two fought on 28 October 2016 with Taihia losing by Unanimous Decision. After the fight, Taihia announced on his Facebook that he retired from boxing. Taihia stated he felt robbed and lost the passion for the sport.

== Controversy ==
In July 2014, Taihia was arrested on drug charges. Originally Taihia was charged with counts of manufacturing methamphetamine and single charges of conspiracy to manufacture methamphetamine, supply of methamphetamine and participation in an organised criminal group. Those charges came after a 12-month covert police operation which ended in November 2012. The charges carried a maximum penalty of life imprisonment. He pleaded guilty mid-trial to one amalgamated charge of being a party to manufacture with the other charges dropped. In November 2014 he was sentenced to two-and-a-half years in prison, however he was released on parole in December 2015 with permission to fight in the ring. Many of his family and friends has stated that this was out of character. His lawyer Peter Winter said Taihia's offending was not out of greed, but due to an obligation-based situation where he wanted to pay for his mother-in-law's funeral, but was not able to due to a shortage of cash.

== Professional boxing titles ==
- New Zealand Professional Boxing Association
  - New Zealand National super middleweight title (2013)
- World Boxing Federation
  - WBF Oceania super middleweight title (2013)
- World Boxing Association
  - Interim PABA light heavyweight title (2014)
- World Boxing Union
  - WBU Inter-Continental light heavyweight title (2014)

== Professional boxing record ==
22 fights	15 wins	5 losses
By knockout	7	2
By decision	8	3
Draws	2	

Res.	Record	Opponent	Type	Rd., Time	Date	Location	Notes
Lose	15–5–2	Andrei Mikhailovich	UD	6	2018-12-15	Horncastle Arena, Christchurch, New Zealand	
Lose	15–4–2	Mose Auimatagi Jnr	TKO	3 (4)	2017-03-18	ABA Stadium, Auckland, New Zealand	
Lose	15–3–2	Robert Berridge	UD	10	2016-10-28	ABA Stadium, Auckland, New Zealand	NZPBA Light Heavyweight Title
Lose	15–2–2	Sefo Falekaono	SD	5	2016-08-13	ellerslie Racecourse, Auckland, New Zealand	
Win	15–1–2	Craig Turner	SD	4	2016-04-02	ABA Stadium, Auckland, New Zealand	
Win	14–1–2	Moses Ioelu	UD	4	2014-10-18	AMI Netball North Harbour Stadium, Auckland, New Zealand	
Win	13–1–2	Sakeasi Dakua	KO	5, (12) 0:42	2014-08-23	ABA Stadium, Auckland, New Zealand	World Boxing Union Inter-Continental light heavyweight title
Win	12–1–2	Togasilimai Letoa	UD	12	2014-05-22	Logan Campbell Centre, Auckland, New Zealand	Interim WBA PABA light heavyweight title
Win	11–1–2	Richard Hackney	KO	1, (10) 2:39	2014-03-22	AMI Netball North Harbour Stadium, Auckland, New Zealand	NZPBA super middleweight title
Win	10–1–2	Peter Tovi'o	RTD	1, (6) 3:00	2013-11-30	ABA Stadium, Auckland, New Zealand	
Win	9–1–2	Gunnar Jackson	UD	10	2013-05-05	ABA Stadium, Auckland, New Zealand	NZPBA super middleweight title Vacant World Boxing Federation Oceania super middleweight title
Draw	8–1–2	Gunnar Jackson	MD	10	2012-10-27	ABA Stadium, Auckland, New Zealand	NZPBA super middleweight title
Win	8–1–1	Vano Kake	UD	4	2011-04-28	ABA Stadium, Auckland, New Zealand	
Win	7–1–1	Scott Taliauli	TKO	2, (6) 0:55	2010-11-26	ASB Stadium, Kohimarama, New Zealand	
Win	6–1–1	Monty Filimaea	UD	6	2010-07-23	ABA Stadium, Auckland, New Zealand	
Lose	5–1–1	Kariz Kariuki	KO	2, (5) 0:41	2009-08-26	Sydney Olympic Park, Homebush, Australia	Australian Contender Super Middleweight Series - Bout 5
Win	5–0–1	Fale Siaoloa	UD	4	2009-04-23	ABA Stadium, Auckland, New Zealand	
Win	4–0–1	Steven Anderson	SD	6	2008-09-25	ABA Stadium, Auckland, New Zealand	
Draw	3–0–1	Steven Anderson	SD	4	2008-08-28	ABA Stadium, Auckland, New Zealand	
Win	3–0	Blair Seager	KO	1,(4) 0:12	2008-07-31	ABA Stadium, Auckland, New Zealand	
Win	2–0	Jade Hughes	KO	1,(4) 0:18	2008-03-27	ABA Stadium, Auckland, New Zealand	
Win	1–0	Damian Johnstone	TKO	1, (4) 1:44	2008-02-29	ABA Stadium, Auckland, New Zealand	
