= Rob Powdrill =

Australian boxer (born 1984)

- Born: Robert Christopher Powdrill; 5 April 1984 (age 42); Western Australia
- Nationality: Australian
- Height: 186 cm (6 ft 1 in)
- Division: Light Heavyweight
- Reach: 188 cm (74 in)
- Stance: Orthodox

Professional boxing record
- Total: 10
- Wins: 6
- By knockout: 1
- Losses: 4
- By knockout: 3
- Draws: 0

Kickboxing record
- Total: 66
- Wins: 49
- Losses: 14
- Draws: 3

Mixed martial arts record
- Total: 4
- Wins: 2
- By knockout: 1
- By submission: 1
- Losses: 2
- By submission: 2

Other information
- Boxing record from BoxRec
- Mixed martial arts record from Sherdog

Rob Powdrill (born 5 April 1984) is an Australian former professional boxer, kickboxer, Muay Thai fighter and mixed martial artist. He has held the IBO Inter-Continental light heavyweight title, WBC Eurasia Pacific Boxing Council light heavyweight title; and challenged for the WKN super middleweight title.

== Boxing ==
Powdrill made his professional boxing debut on 23 June 2007 in Perth, WA, Australia, scoring a unanimous decision against Brian Ebersole in a four-round bout at cruiserweight.

On 8 November 2014 in Brisbane, QLD, Australia, Powdrill knocked out London Olympian Damien Hooper in 21 seconds to win the WBC Eurasia Pacific Boxing Council light heavyweight title.

On 13 February 2015 in Perth, WA, Australia, Powdrill defeated David Letizia by unanimous decision in a 12-round rematch to win the vacant IBO Asia Pacific cruiserweight title.

On 22 August in New Plymouth, New Zealand, Powdrill defeated Sam Rapira by split decision in a 10-round bout to win the vacant IBO Inter-Continental light heavyweight title.

On 28 November 2015 in Mansfield, QLD, Australia, Powdrill suffered a defeat by knockout in the eighth round against Trent Broadhurst in their fight for the vacant IBF Pan Pacific light heavyweight title.

== Kickboxing ==
Over the course of his kickboxing career, Powdrill held numerous titles, including the WKN, WMC and ISKA, Australian titles, as well as the IKBF and WMC WA State titles, the IKBF South Pacific title and WMF World title.

On 17 March 2012, in Agde, France, Powdrill challenged Francis Tavares for the vacant WKN super middleweight title, but lost the fight by knockout in the second round with head kick.

On 12 September 2015, in Barcelona, Spain, as part of WKN Australia Top Team, Powdrill faced Lorenzo Javier Jorge at the event "The Circle" and lost the fight by unanimous decision.

== Mixed martial arts ==
Powdrill made his professional debut in MMA on 20 December 2009 in Sydney, NSW, winning the fight by submission in the first round against Nathan Hurihangani.

On 21 January 2012 in Perth, WA, Powdrill defeated Ashe Bowman by TKO in the first round with punches.

On 24 April 1012 in Perth, WA, Powdrill lost the fight by submission in the first round against Pat Crawley.

On 29 June 2012 in Perth, WA, Powdrill faced David Johnson and lost the fight via rear-naked choke in the first round.

On 17 March 2018 in Perth, WA, Powdrill was expected to face Peter Davenport, but the fight didn't go ahead.
