= Blake Caparello =

Australian Professional Boxer (born 1985)

Personal information
- Nickname: IL CAPO
- Nationality: Australian
- Born: Blake Caparello; 30 August 1986 (age 39) Essendon, Victoria, Australia
- Height: 6 ft 1 in (1.85 m)
- Weight: Light Heavyweight

Boxing career
- Reach: 74 in (188 cm)
- Stance: Southpaw

Boxing record
- Total fights: 35
- Wins: 30
- Win by KO: 13
- Losses: 4
- Draws: 1
- No contests: 0

Blake Caparello (born 30 August 1985) is an Australian Light Heavyweight Professional Boxer. Challenged formidable Sergey Kovalev for his first World Title in 2014.

== Professional career ==
Caparello made his professional debut at the age of 22 on August 16, 2009, with a unanimous decision against Aaron Ross at Shed 14 Central Pier Peninsula in Melbourne, Victoria

On 27 November 2009, in Caparello's 3rd professional fight he won the Vacant Victoria State Light Heavyweight Title against Dennis Okcal. He went on to retain the Title against Joel Casey on 9 April 2010.

On 5 August 2011, Caparello defeated Joseph Kwadjo by UD and won the Interim OPBF Light Heavyweight Title.

On 18 November 2011, Caparello defeated Michael Van Nimwegen by TKO to win the Vacant Australian Light Heavyweight Title.

On 18 April 2013, Caparello defeated Jorge Rodriguez Olivera by UD and won the PABA Light Heavyweight Title. He went on to retain the title against Daniel MacKinnon on 25 July 2013.

On 17 October 2013, Caparello defeated Allan Green by twelfth round UD to win the vacant International Boxing Organization Light Heavyweight title. Green failed to make weight for the bout, so the title was at stake for Caparello only and would have become vacant had Green won. The win against Green caught the eyes of U.S Promoter DiBella Entertainment and signed Caparello to a 3 fight deal.

Caparello would go on to make an impressive U.S debut on 31 January 2014, against Elvir Muriqi at Richard J. Codey Arena, West Orange, New Jersey. Where he would become victorious by Unanimous Decision after a 10 round bout.

Caparello challenged for his first world title on 2 August 2014, against WBO Light Heavyweight champion Sergey Kovalev. Caparello, undefeated before the bout, shocked Kovalev in the first round, knocking him down with a straight left hand but lost by second-round technical knockout.

On 13 December 2014, Caparello would bounce back from his loss against Kovalev, with a UD win against Maximiliano Jorge Gomez and won the WBO Asia Pacific Light Heavyweight Title.

On 5 June 2015, Caparello made his long awaited Super Middleweight debut and defeated Affif Belghecham by UD and won PABA and WBO Oriental Super Middleweight Titles.

On 14 July 2017, Caparello defeated Jordan Tai by TKO and won WBA Oceania Light Heavyweight title. He retained the title with a TKO win against Fabiano Pena on 13 October 2017.

On 16 March 2018, Caparello was a defeated by Isaac Chilemba for the WBC Light Heavyweight Title.

On 22 February 2019, Caparello defeated Reagan Dessaix by UD and won WBA Oceania Light Heavyweight Title.

== Professional boxing record ==
30 Wins (13 knockouts, 17 decisions), 3 Losses, 1 Draw
Res.	Record	Opponent	Type	Rd., Time	Date	Location	Notes
Win	29–3–1	(Australia) Reagan Dessaix	UD	10	2019-02-22	(Australia) The Melbourne Pavilion, Flemington, Victoria	Won WBA Oceania Light Heavyweight title.
Win	28–3–1	(Australia) Lance Bryant	TKO	3 (8), 1:46	2018-08-31	(Australia) Croatian Club, Footscray, Victoria	
Win	27–3–1	(Australia) Trent Broadhurst	TKO	1 (10), 2:05	2018-06-01	(Australia) The Melbourne Pavilion, Flemington, Victoria	
Loss	26–3–1	(Malawi) Isaac Chilemba	UD	12	2018-03-16	(Australia) The Melbourne Pavilion, Flemington, Victoria	For vacant WBC International Light Heavyweight title.
Win	26–2–1	(Brazil) Fabiano Pena	TKO	3 (10), 2:22	2017-10-13	(Australia) The Melbourne Pavilion, Flemington, Victoria	Retained WBA Oceania Light Heavyweight title.
Win	25–2–1	(New Zealand) Jordan Tai	TKO	6 (10), 1:06	2017-07-14	(Australia) The Melbourne Pavilion, Flemington, Victoria	Won vacant WBA Oceania Light Heavyweight title.
Win	24–2–1	(Bolivia) Ricky Torrez	KO	1	2016-11-25	(Australia) The Melbourne Pavilion, Flemington, Victoria	
Win	23–2–1	(Brazil) Rogerio Damasco	TKO	5 (10), 2:49	2016-08-13	(Australia) The Melbourne Pavilion, Flemington, Victoria	
Loss	22–2–1	(United States) Andre Dirrell	UD	10	2016-04-29	(United States) Trump Taj Mahal, Atlantic City, New Jersey	
Win	22–1–1	(Australia) Luke Sharp	UD	6	2015-11-11	(Australia) Convention & Exhibition Centre, Melbourne, Victoria	
Win	21–1–1	(France) Affif Belghecham	UD	10	2015-06-05	(Australia) The Melbourne Pavilion, Flemington, Victoria	Won vacant PABA and vacant WBO Oriental Light Heavyweight titles.
Win	20–1–1	(Argentina) Maximiliano Jorge Gomez	UD	10	2014-12-13	(Australia) The Melbourne Pavilion, Flemington, Victoria	Won vacant WBO Asia Pacific Light Heavyweight title.
Loss	19–1–1	(Russia) Sergey Kovalev	TKO	2 (12), 1:47	2014-08-02	(United States) Revel Resort, Atlantic City, New Jersey	For WBO Light Heavyweight title.
Win	19–0–1	(Albania) Elvir Muriqi	UD	10	2014-01-31	(United States) Richard J. Codey Arena, West Orange, New Jersey	
Win	18–0–1	(United States) Allan Green	UD	12	2013-10-17	(Australia) The Melbourne Pavilion, Flemington, Victoria	Won vacant IBO Light Heavyweight title.
Win	17–0–1	(New Zealand) Daniel MacKinnon	MD	12	2013-07-25	(Australia) The Melbourne Pavilion, Flemington, Victoria	Retained PABA Light Heavyweight title.
Win	16–0–1	(Uruguay) Jorge Rodriguez Olivera	UD	12	2013-04-18	(Australia) Croatian Club, Footscray, Victoria	Won vacant PABA Light Heavyweight title.
Win	15–0–1	(Ghana) Ayitey Powers	UD	8	2013-03-01	(Australia) Grand Star Receptions, Altona North, Victoria	
Win	14–0–1	(United States) Aaron Pryor Jr	UD	10	2012-10-05	(Australia) Croatian Club, Ardeer, Victoria	
Win	13–0–1	(United States) Dante Craig	TKO	2 (8)	2012-07-20	(Australia) Grand Star Receptions, Altona North, Victoria	
Win	12–0–1	(New Zealand) Robert Berridge	UD	10	2012-05-18	(Australia) The Melbourne Pavilion, Flemington, Victoria	
Win	11–0–1	(United States) Kevin Engel	UD	10	2012-03-09	(Australia) Croatian Club, Footscray, Victoria	
Win	10–0–1	(Australia) Michael Van Nimwegen	TKO	7 (10), 2:58	2011-11-18	(Australia) The Melbourne Pavilion, Flemington, Victoria	Won vacant Australian Light Heavyweight title.
Win	9–0–1	(Ghana) Joseph Kwadjo	UD	12	2011-08-05	(Australia) The Melbourne Pavilion, Flemington, Victoria	Won interim OPBF Light Heavyweight title.
Win	8–0–1	(Samoa) Togasilimai Letoa	TKO	1 (6), 2:59	2011-05-13	(Australia) The Melbourne Pavilion, Flemington, Victoria	
Win	7–0–1	(Thailand) Komgrit Nanakorn	TKO	7 (10), 0:51	2011-04-01	(Australia) Malvern Town Hall, Malvern, Victoria	
Win	6–0–1	(Australia) Michael Bolling	UD	8	2011-03-04	(Australia) The Melbourne Pavilion, Flemington, Victoria	
Draw	5–0–1	(Australia) Shane McConville	SD	10	2010-12-03	(Australia) Coburg City Hall, Coburg, Victoria	For Australian Light Heavyweight title.
Win	5–0	(Australia) Kane McKay	TKO	8 (10), 2:55	2010-06-25	(Australia) Malvern Town Hall, Malvern, Victoria	
Win	4–0	(Australia) Joel Casey	UD	8	2010-04-09	(Australia) Malvern Town Hall, Malvern, Victoria	Retained Australia – Victoria State Light Heavyweight title.
Win	3–0	(Australia) Dennis Okcal	RTD	6 (8), 3:00	2009-11-27	(Australia) Knox Netball Centre, Ferntree Gully, Victoria	Won vacant Australia – Victoria State Light Heavyweight title.
Win	2–0	(New Zealand) Joshua Tai	UD	4	2009-09-25	(Australia) Prestige Warehouse, Port Melbourne, Victoria	
Win	1–0	(Australia) Aaron Ross	UD	6	2009-08-16	(Australia) Shed 14 Central Pier Peninsula, Melbourne, Victoria	Professional debut.
