= The Contender Australia =

- Created by: Mark Burnett
- Starring: Charlotte Dawson, Daniel Amalm
- Country of origin: Australia
- Original language: English
- No. of seasons: 1
- No. of episodes: 11

Production
- Production location: Sydney, Australia
- Running time: Varies
- Production company: Granada Productions

Original release
- Network: Fox8
- Release: 2 November 2009 – 11 January 2010

The Contender Australia is a reality television show based on the sport of boxing, but with an added element of insight into the competitor's lives and relationships with each other within the show's living quarters. The series was filmed in Sydney, Australia and was first aired on Australian Pay-Television channel Fox8 on 3 November 2009. The winner will win the Contender Australia title and a A$250,000 prize-"fight" with Anthony Mundine.

== Contestants ==
The following 14 fighters, hailing from Australia and New Zealand, were selected to take part in the Contender Tournament which took place at the Super Middleweight division.

Records entering tournament in parentheses (W-L-D)

- Ben "The Juicer" McCulloch(3(2 by KO)-0-0)
- Adrian Taihia(5(3 by KO)-0-1)
- Israel "Cobra" Kani (9(4 by KO)-2-2)
- Josh "Cast Iron" Clenshaw (26(13 by KO)-16-0)
- Daniel MacKinnon (13(7 by KO)-4-1)
- Garth "From the Hood" Wood (4(2 by KO)-1-0)
- Junior "The One" Talipeau (14(5 by KO)-0-0)
- Kariz "Peter" Kariuki (18(17 by KO)-7-2)
- Les "Diamond" Piper (10(2 by KO)-2-3)
- Luke "Kool Hand" Moloney (13-4-0)
- Sonni "Jungle Boy" Michael Angelo (15(5 by KO)-8-2)
- Victor "The Crushin Russian" Oganov (28(28 by KO)-2-0)
- Pradeep "The Indian Warrior" Singh(15(8 by KO)-1-1)
- Nader "Lionheart" Hamdan (41(18 by KO)-6-0)

== Trainers ==
- Billy Hussien (Blue Team)
- Paul Briggs (Gold Team)

== Hosts ==
- Charlotte Dawson
- Daniel Amalm

== Guest appearances ==
- Sakio Bika
- Joe Bugner
- Sugar Ray Leonard
- Anthony Mundine

== Fight results ==
Episode 1

- Josh Clenshaw defeated Israel Kani by split decision.
  - Garth Wood and Ben McCulloch qualified for Round 2 through winning the challenge.
  - Blue Team 0, Gold Team 1

Episode 2

- Daniel MacKinnon defeated Luke Moloney by 3rd round KO.
  - Blue Team 0, Gold Team 2

Episode 3

- Nader Hamden defeated Les Piper by a Unanimous decision.
  - Blue Team 1, Gold Team 2

Episode 4

- Victor Oganov defeats Junior Talipeau by Majority decision.
  - 48-48 | 48-47 | 48-47
  - Blue Team 2, Gold Team 2

Episode 5

- Kariz Kariuki defeated Adrian Taihia by 2nd round KO.
- Sonni Michael Angelo defeated Pradeep Singh by Unanimous decision
  - 48-47 | 49-48 | 49-46
  - Blue Team 2, Gold Team 4

Episode 6

- Ben McCulloch leaves the house due to neck injury from the advice of his physio
- Israel Kani replaces Ben McCulloch and is now fighting Garth Wood
- The fighters meet up with Sugar Ray Leonard
- Garth Wood defeated Israel Kani by 2nd round KO.

Episode 7

- Victor Oganov defeats Sonni Michael Angelo by Unanimous Decision
  - 49-45 | 49-46 | 48-46

Episode 8

- Josh Clenshaw defeats Daniel MacKinnon by Majority Decision
  - 48-48 | 48-47 | 50-45

Episode 9

- Kariz Kariuki defeats Nader Hamden by Unanimous Decision.
  - 49-46 | 48-46 | 49-45

Episode 10

- Garth Woods defeats Victor Oganov by Majority Points Decision.
- Kariz Kariuki defeats Josh Clenshaw by Unanimous Decision.

== See also ==
- Boxing in Australia
