= Steve Heremaia =

New Zealand boxer (born 1985)

- Born: Steve Heremaia; 23 June 1985 (age 41); South Auckland, New Zealand
- Nationality: New Zealander
- Height: 171 cm (5 ft 7 in)
- Weight: 72.5 kg (160 lb; 11 st 6 lb)
- Division: Middleweight
- Reach: 168 cm (66.1 in)
- Style: Boxing
- Stance: Orthodox
- Trainer: Chris Martin
- Years active: 2005–2012

Professional boxing record
- Total: 25
- Wins: 18
- By knockout: 9
- Losses: 6
- By knockout: 0
- Draws: 1

Other information
- Website: www.stevenheremaia.com
- Boxing record from BoxRec
- Last updated on: 28 January 2017

Steve Heremaia (born 23 June 1985 in South Auckland, New Zealand) is a retired New Zealand professional boxer. Heremaia is a former WBO Oriental middleweight Champion and peaked 14th on the WBO World rankings. Heremaia has never been knocked out let alone knocked down in his career. Heremaia is a former New Zealand National Amateur champion, winning his title in 2003.

== Professional boxing titles ==
- World Boxing Organisation
  - WBO Oriental Middleweight Title (159¾ Ibs)

== Professional boxing record ==
25 fights	18 wins	6 losses
By knockout	9	0
By decision	9	6
Draws	1	

No.	Result	Record	Opponent	Type	Round, time	Date	Location	Notes
25	Win	18–6–1	(New Zealand) Lee Oti	KO	1 (12) 2:37	29 June 2012	ABA Stadium, Auckland, New Zealand	vacant WBO Oriental middleweight title
24	Win	17–6–1	(New Zealand) Brad Pole	KO	2 (6) 1:47	13 August 2011	Vodafone Events Centre, Manukau City, New Zealand	
23	Lose	16–6–1	(Ukraine) Viktor Chernous	MD	8	4 March 2011	The Melbourne Pavilion, Flemington, Victoria, Australia	
22	Lose	16–5–1	(Cameroon) Samuel Colomban	SD	12	27 November 2010	The Melbourne Pavilion, Flemington, Victoria, Australia	WBO Oriental & interim WBO Africa welterweight title
21	Draw	16–4–1	(India) Venkatesan Harikrishnan	MD	8	21 August 2010	Panmure Lagoon Stadium, Panmure, New Zealand	
20	Win	16–4	(Fiji) Joy Ali	UD	10	26 June 2010	Prince Charles Park, Nadi, Fiji	
19	Win	15–4	(New Zealand) David Wiremu	TKO	3 (6) 2:34	21 May 2010	Langham Hotel, Auckland, New Zealand	
18	Lose	14–4	(India) Venkatesan Harikrishnan	SD	4	31 January 2010	ABA Stadium, Auckland, New Zealand	
17	Win	14–3	(New Zealand) Lee Oti	UD	6	28 November 2009	Sky City Convention Centre, Auckland, New Zealand	
16	Win	13–3	(Australia) Frank LoPorto	UD	6	3 October 2009	Mystery Creek Events Centre, Hamilton, New Zealand	
15	Win	12–3	(Samoa) Ionatana Pula	TKO	3 (4) 1:45	5 June 2009	ABA Stadium, Auckland, New Zealand	
14	Lose	11–3	(New Zealand) Lee Oti	SD	6	7 March 2009	Rugby Park, Gisborne, New Zealand	
13	Win	11–2	(Samoa) Faimasasa Tavu'i	UD	4	8 November 2008	ASB Stadium, Kohimarama, New Zealand	
12	Lose	10–2	(Australia) Ryan Waters	UD	12	27 June 2008	Cronulla Sutherland Leagues Club, Cronulla, New South Wales, Australia	International Boxing Organization Asia Pacific & vacant WBO Oriental super welterweight title
11	Win	10–1	(New Zealand) Jamie Waru	UD	6	1 December 2007	Headhunters Motorcycle Club, Ellerslie, New Zealand	
10	Win	9–1	(New Zealand) David Wiremu	PTS	6	2 November 2007	Sky City Convention Centre, Auckland, New Zealand	
9	Win	8–1	(New Zealand) Jamie Waru	KO	2 (6) 2:56	3 August 2007	Sky City Convention Centre, Auckland, New Zealand	
8	Win	7–1	(Samoa) Fili Mailata	UD	4	8 June 2007	Sky City Convention Centre, Auckland, New Zealand	
7	Win	6–1	(Samoa) Fili Mailata	UD	4	5 May 2007	Headhunters Motorcycle Club, Ellerslie, New Zealand	
6	Win	5–1	(Fiji) Wahid Khan	TKO	6 (8) 0:31	8 April 2006	Kath Day Hall, Otahuhu, New Zealand	
5	Win	4–1	(United States) Jay Washington	TKO	1 (4) 1:37	11 November 2005	Broncos Leagues Club, Red Hill, Queensland, Australia	
4	Win	3–1	(New Zealand) Chris Rehu	PTS	4	3 September 2005	YMCA Stadium, Auckland, New Zealand	
3	Lose	2–1	(New Zealand) David Wiremu	SD	4	29 April 2005	ASB Stadium, Kohimarama, New Zealand	
2	Win	2–0	(New Zealand) Corey Burton	TKO	2 (4)	31 March 2005	The Trusts Arena, Auckland, New Zealand	
1	Win	1–0	(New Zealand) Ali Nizi	TKO	1 (4)	5 March 2005	ETA Stadium, Auckland, New Zealand	Professional debut
