= Boxing at the 2010 Summer Youth Olympics – Men's 75 kg =

Boxing competitions

These are the results of the Men's Middle 75 kg competition in boxing at the 2010 Summer Youth Olympics in Singapore. Preliminaries were held on August 21, semifinals on August 22, 5th place bout on August 23, the bronze medal bout on August 24 and the Final bout on August 25. Unlike world championships and the Olympic Games, only one bronze medal is awarded.

== Medalists ==
Damien Hooper
Australia
Juan Carlos Carrillo
Colombia
Zoltán Harcsa
Hungary

== Results ==
Preliminaries
Joe Ward (IRL) | 2
Damien Hooper (AUS) | 4
Zoltán Harcsa (HUN) | 6
Adlet Rakishev (KAZ) | 1

Semifinals
Muideen Akanji (NGR) | 0
Juan Carlos Carrillo (COL) | 5
Damien Hooper (AUS) | 4
Zoltán Harcsa (HUN) | 0

Final
Juan Carlos Carrillo (COL) | 4
Damien Hooper (AUS) | 12
Third place
Muideen Akanji (NGR) | 1
Zoltán Harcsa (HUN) | 8

| 5th place bout |
| Joe Ward (IRL) |
| Adlet Rakishev (KAZ) | WO |
