= Soulan Pownceby =

New Zealand boxer

- Born: Soulan James Rikihana; 4 May 1975 (age 51); Christchurch, New Zealand
- Nationality: New Zealander
- Height: 183 cm (6 ft 0 in)
- Weight: 79.3 kg (175 lb; 12 st 7 lb)
- Division: Light Heavyweight
- Years active: 2007 - 2012

Professional boxing record
- Total: 21
- Wins: 20
- By knockout: 9
- Losses: 0
- Draws: 1

Other information
- Boxing record from BoxRec

Soulan James Pownceby (née Soulan James Rikihana, born 4 May 1975 in Christchurch) is a New Zealand boxer who was described by TVNZ in 2004 as one of New Zealand's most exciting talents since David Tua. He is also notable for convictions for assault and manslaughter.

== Amateur career ==
As an amateur, Pownceby was one of the New Zealand team's main hopes for a boxing medal in the 2006 Melbourne Commonwealth games but he was eliminated from the competition after losing 6–26 against his first opponent.

Pownceby had an impressive amateur record and won numerous New Zealand gold medals as a middle weight, light-heavy weight, and heavy weight.

Pownceby was also selected for the 2004 Athens Olympics and was the only boxer chosen to represent New Zealand at this event. Pownceby was eliminated from the competition after losing 19–33 against his first opponent.

Pownceby is a four time New Zealand National Amateur Champion, winning in 2001 (Middle), 2002 (Light Heavy), 2005 (Light Heavy) and 2006 (Heavy).

== Professional career ==
Pownceby defeated Joel Casey for the World Boxing Foundation light-heavyweight title on 17 June 2010. Pownceby, who was ranked 9th in the July 2010 WBO light heavyweight rankings, was in superb form and won the fight over 12 rounds.

Pownceby has also held the WBO Asia Pacific light-heavyweight title after defeating Togasilamai Letoa in a 12-round fight.

Pownceby is ranked fifth in New Zealand's pound for pound record.

After defeating Daniel MacKinnon, Pownceby was ranked 1st in WBO in July 2012, however despite reaching the number one mandatory position, Pownceby would not be able to fight for a world title due passed convictions which makes him unable to leave the county. Pownceby was unable to fight again due to a serious neck injury.

== Professional boxing titles ==
- New Zealand National Boxing Federation (NZNBF) cruiserweight title (180½ Ibs)
- WBO Asia Pacific light heavyweight title (174½ Ibs)
- World Boxing Foundation World light heavyweight title (175 Ibs)

== Professional boxing record ==
21 fights	20 wins	0 losses
By knockout	9	0
By decision	11	0
Draws	1	

No.	Result	Record	Opponent	Type	Round, time	Date	Location	Notes
21	Win	20–0-1	(New Zealand) Daniel MacKinnon	TD	7 (12) 1:15	1 Jun 2012	ABA Stadium, Auckland, New Zealand	WBO Asia Pacific light heavyweight title
20	Win	19–0-1	(Samoa) Peter Tovi'o	TKO	4 (6) 2:58	18 Nov 2011	ABA Stadium, Auckland, New Zealand	
19	Win	18–0-1	(New Zealand) John Conway	TKO	11 (12) 1:22	17 Jun 2011	ABA Stadium, Auckland, New Zealand	WBO Asia Pacific light heavyweight title
18	Win	17–0-1	(Fiji) Mosese Sorovi	PTS	8	28 Jan 2011	Salle Louis 'Babo' Aitamai de Fautaua, Papeete, French Polynesia	
17	Win	16–0-1	(New Zealand) Fale Siaoloa	UD	4	30 Oct 2010	ASB Stadium, Kohimarama, New Zealand	
16	Win	15–0-1	(Australia) Joel Casey	UD	12	17 Jun 2010	ABA Stadium, Auckland, New Zealand	World Boxing Foundation World & WBO Asia Pacific light heavyweight title
15	Win	14–0-1	(New Zealand) Fale Siaoloa	UD	6	13 Mar 2010	Cowles Stadium, Christchurch, New Zealand	
14	Win	13–0-1	(Samoa) Faimasasa Tavu'i	RTD	4 (12) 3:00	7 Nov 2009	ABA Stadium, Auckland, New Zealand	WBO Asia Pacific light heavyweight title
13	Draw	12–0-1	(New Zealand) Shane Chapman	TD	3 (6) 1:40	3 Oct 2009	Mystery Creek Events Centre, Hamilton, New Zealand	
12	Win	12–0	(Samoa) Togasilimai Letoa	UD	12	28 Aug 2009	ASB Stadium, Kohimarama, New Zealand	vacant WBO Asia Pacific light heavyweight title
11	Win	11–0	(Samoa) Bob Gasio	RTD	3 (10) 3:00	17 Jul 2009	ABA Stadium, Auckland, New Zealand	
10	Win	10–0	(Samoa) Moses Ioelu	TKO	2 (6)	6 Jun 2009	Lagoon Stadium, Panmure, Auckland, New Zealand	
9	Win	9–0	(Samoa) Ioane Talamauga	UD	5 (6) 0:01	28 May 2009	ABA Stadium, Auckland, New Zealand	
8	Win	8–0	(Samoa) Ioane Talamauga	UD	4	23 Apr 2009	ABA Stadium, Auckland, New Zealand	
7	Win	7–0	(Samoa) Niusila Seiuli	TKO	3 (4) 1:37	11 Dec 2008	Manurewa Netball Centre, Manurewa, New Zealand	
6	Win	6–0	(Samoa) Niusila Seiuli	TKO	4 (4) 1:49	8 Nov 2008	ASB Stadium, Kohimarama, New Zealand	
5	Win	5–0	(Samoa) Togasilimai Letoa	MD	4	16 Sep 2008	Leisure Centre, Otara, New Zealand	
4	Win	4–0	(Samoa) Wilhem Schwalger	UD	12	28 Jun 2008	Brewster Recreation Centre, South Auckland, New Zealand	New Zealand National Boxing Federation (NZNBF) cruiserweight title
3	Win	3–0	(New Zealand) Supi Moi Moi	UD	6	11 Apr 2008	Sky City Convention Centre, Auckland, New Zealand	
2	Win	2–0	(Pakistan) Kashif Mumtaz	PTS	4	2 Nov 2007	Sky City Convention Centre, Auckland, New Zealand	
1	Win	1–0	(New Zealand) Wayne Orbell	KO	1 (4) 1:16	3 Aug 2007	Sky City Convention Centre, Auckland, New Zealand	Professional debut

== Convictions ==
On 19 October 1994, Pownceby killed his five-month-old daughter Jeanette Rikihana. Despite claiming to Police that he had dropped her in the shower, the post-mortem revealed "horrendous injuries - severe bruising to the head, including a cracked skull, and internal bruising." In addition to the injuries that resulted in her death, the autopsy also revealed that the baby was suffering from "six fractured ribs caused by a chest injury at least two weeks before her death" and was "malnourished with wasting buttocks and thighs".

Pownceby was charged with murder, however the jury at his murder trial ruled that he was not guilty of murder but was guilty of manslaughter. Pownceby was sentenced to four years in jail.

During the period 1998 to 2000, Pownceby was convicted of four violent assaults. One of these assaults was committed against an unnamed woman.

== Personal life ==
Pownceby has faced numerous difficulties throughout his life. His father (a United States Navy serviceman) has never acknowledged him, his sister was murdered by her partner in 1990, and his mother died of cancer in 1993. Pownceby was jailed in 1995 for four years for the manslaughter of his 5-month-old daughter and converted to Catholicism following his release from prison in 1998. In 2004 Pownceby said he could not change the past but that he was "trying to be the best person I can be".

In 2006 Pownceby announced that he intended to donate his first professional boxing purse to child cancer.
