= Barry Wood (rugby league) =

Australian rugby league footballer

Personal information
- Full name: Barry Wood
- Born: 18 January 1950 (age 76) Camperdown, New South Wales, Australia

Playing information
- Position: Halfback
Club
Years	Team	Pld	T	G	FG	P
1970–71	Newtown	23	1	7	1	19
1974	South Sydney	8	3	0	0	9
1975–77	North Sydney	41	23	7	0	85
1978–79	Newtown	22	3	0	0	9
	Total	94	30	14	1	122
- Relatives: Garth Wood (son); Nathan Wood (son)

Barry Wood (born 1950) is an Australian former rugby league footballer who played in the 1970s for Newtown, North Sydney and South Sydney in the NSWRL competition. He is the father of former rugby league players Garth Wood and Nathan Wood.

== Playing career ==
Wood began his first grade career with Newtown in 1970. Wood spent four years at Newtown before joining South Sydney in 1974. Wood spent 1 season with Souths and played at halfback in the club's 24-8 finals loss to Western Suburbs. In 1975, Wood joined North Sydney and played 3 uneventful years at the club but did finish top try scorer in 1977 for the team. In 1978, Wood rejoined Newtown and played 2 seasons for them with the club coming last in 1978 and second last in 1979. Wood was not re-signed by Newtown for the 1980 season and then retired.

== Post playing ==
Wood later became a trainer and associate to Kerry Packer and then became involved in his son Garth's boxing career.
