= Garth Wood =

Australian rugby league footballer, and boxer

Personal information
- Full name: Garth Wood
- Born: 13 June 1978 (age 48) Sydney, NSW, Australia

Playing information
- Height: 179 cm (5 ft 10 in)
- Weight: 80 kg (12 st 8 lb)
- Position: Wing, Fullback
Club
Years	Team	Pld	T	G	FG	P
1997–98	South Sydney	6	0	0	0	0
1999	Balmain Tigers	3	0	0	0	0
2004–05	South Sydney	16	6	0	0	24
	Total	25	6	0	0	24
- Boxing career
- Nickname: From the Hood
- Nationality: Australian
- Weight: Super Middleweight
- Father: Barry Wood
- Relatives: Nathan Wood (brother)
- Stance: Orthodox

Boxing record
- Total fights: 17
- Wins: 12
- Win by KO: 6
- Losses: 4
- Draws: 1
- No contests: 0

Garth Wood (born 13 June 1978) is an Australian professional boxer and former professional rugby league footballer. Wood won the 2009/2010 Contender Boxing Series. He played rugby league for the South Sydney Rabbitohs and the Balmain Tigers in the NRL.

== Background ==
Wood was born in Sydney.

Garth is the brother of Balmain Tigers, Sydney Roosters and Warrington Wolves utility Nathan Wood and the son of Newtown, Norths and Souths halfback Barry Wood.

== Rugby league career ==
A Souths junior Wood seemed destined to play the game as his father, Barry Wood, was a halfback for the club and his older brother, Nathan, also a Souths junior, signed and played for fellow foundation club Balmain Tigers in 1993. Wood debuted for Souths at 17 years of age, but his rugby league career was fledging as he only played nine games for Souths and Balmain between 1997 and 1999, before four gap where he rejoined the Rabbitohs in 2004 and appeared in a further 16 games. After this Wood decided to make a career out of boxing like fellow league converts Anthony Mundine and Solomon Haumono. Wood describes the area he grew up in was a factor in his career path "When I was growing up, it was a tough area: you either played footy or fought".

== Boxing career ==
In only his eighth professional bout, on 11 January 2010 Wood became the first winner of The Contender Australia by defeating Kariz Kariuki by a split points decision after seven rounds. The win earned him $25,000 and a fight with "The Man" Mundine. Wood overcame Victor Oganov in the five round semi-final by a majority decision and stopped Israel Kani in the second round of the quarter-finals to reach the final against Kariuki. Throughout the filming of The Contender Australia Wood was rated a Super Middleweight along with all the other contestants.

On 8 December 2010 Wood defeated Anthony Mundine by knockout at the Acer Arena. Wood was aggressive from round 1, attempting to rough up and lure Mundine into a brawl, in the fifth round it was a left hook to the jaw that dropped Mundine while he was bending his body sideways and considerably low. Wood had to drop weight to Middleweight for the fight after the Mundine camp offered $100,000 as a sweetener. They originally wanted Wood to drop to a Junior Middleweight, but Wood refused. Wood lost to Mundine in a rematch via a points decision.

== Television career ==
Wood is a co-anchor of Fight Call Out on Fox Sports

== Professional Boxing Record ==
Professional record breakdown
0 matches	wins	losses

Date	Result	Opponent	Method	Round	Time	Location	Notes
19 February 2014	Loss	Daniel Geale	RTD	6	3:00	Hordern Pavilion, Moore Park, NSW, Australia	
16 May 2013	Win	Virgil Kalakoda	TKO	2	1:07	The Melbourne Pavilion, Flemington, VIC, Australia	
15 February 2013	Win	Togasilimai Letoa	TKO	9	1:12	All Sorts Arena, Alexandria, NSW, Australia	
12 February 2012	Loss	Sam Soliman	Decision (Unanimous)	12		Olympic Park Sports Centre, Homebush, NSW, Australia	
13 April 2011	Loss	Anthony Mundine	Decision (Unanimous)	10		Brisbane Entertainment Centre, Brisbane, QLD, Australia	
8 December 2010	Win	Anthony Mundine	KO	5	0:58	Acer Arena, Sydney, NSW, Australia	
