= Nathan Wood (rugby league) =

Australian rugby league footballer

Personal information
- Born: 24 January 1972 (age 54) Darlinghurst, New South Wales, Australia

Playing information
- Height: 178 cm (5 ft 10 in)
- Weight: 90 kg (14 st 2 lb)
- Position: Five-eighth, Halfback, Hooker
Club
Years	Team	Pld	T	G	FG	P
1993–94	Balmain Tigers	19	4	0	0	16
1995–00	Sydney City	78	17	0	0	68
2001	New Zealand Warriors	17	1	0	0	4
2002	Wakefield Trinity Wildcats	11	2	0	0	8
2002–05	Warrington Wolves	90	69	0	3	163
	Total	215	93	0	3	259
- Father: Barry Wood
- Relatives: Garth Wood (brother)

Nathan Wood (born 24 January 1972 in Darlinghurst, New South Wales) is an Australian former professional rugby league footballer. Wood played in almost every position during his career, from fullback to second-row.

== Playing career ==
Wood was a Souths junior but made his first-grade début for Balmain in round 17 of the 1993 season. Between 1993 and 2001 he played for the Balmain Tigers, Sydney Roosters and the New Zealand Warriors in the NSWRL premiership, Australian Rugby League and National Rugby League. He then moved to the Super League and played for the Wakefield Trinity Wildcats and the Warrington Wolves. He retired at the end of 2005 due to injury, moving back to Australia to care for his two sons.

During his Warrington career Nat was in the victorious team that played the final game at Wilderspool Stadium in 2003 and was the first try scorer at the new Halliwell Jones Stadium in 2004, both games were against his old club Wakefield.

Wood appeared as a challenger on the 2008 series of Australian Gladiators.

Wood is the son of former Newtown, Norths and Souths halfback, Barry Wood, and brother of The Contender Australia winner and former Souths player Garth Wood.

== Sources ==
- Alan Whiticker & Glen Hudson (2007). The Encyclopedia of Rugby League Players. Wetherill Park, New South Wales: Gary Allen Pty Ltd. p. 598. ISBN 978-1-877082-93-1.
