= Damien Hooper =

Australian boxer (born 1992)

Personal information
- Nickname: Super Hooper
- Nationality: Australian
- Born: 5 February 1992 (age 34) Toowoomba, Queensland Australia
- Height: 6 ft 0 in (183 cm)
- Weight: Light-heavyweight

Boxing career
- Reach: 80 in (203 cm)

Boxing record
- Total fights: 15
- Wins: 14
- Win by KO: 9
- Losses: 1
Medal record
Summer Youth Olympics
Gold medal – first place	2010 Singapore	Middleweight
AIBA Youth World Boxing Championships
Silver medal – second place	2010 AIBA	Middleweight

Damien Hooper (born 5 February 1992) is an Indigenous Australian professional boxer. As an amateur he was selected to represent Australia at the 2012 Summer Olympics in the light-heavyweight division.

== Early life ==
Hooper was raised by his grandmother, Lillian Weribone, in a Dalby Queensland, Australia. Hooper began boxing at the age of eleven with older brother Troy Hooper. He was in trouble with the law and the local policeman there named Chris Seng had been a pro boxer. He ran the police citizens youth club and suggested that Hooper take up boxing.

== Amateur boxing career ==
In 2010, he became the first Indigenous Australian to win a junior world title when he won the 75 kg category at the Youth Olympics in Singapore. In the same year, he won a silver medal at the Youth World Championships in Baku, Azerbaijan, and was selected in the Australian team for the 2010 Commonwealth Games in New Delhi. He was an Australian Institute of Sport boxing scholarship holder.

The following year, Hooper stepped up a weight division and into open competition. He returned to Baku for the 2011 World Amateur Boxing Championships – Light heavyweight 2011 World Amateur Boxing Championships, where he made the quarter finals, being edged out by Julio César La Cruz 13:14 and earned direct qualification for the London Olympics.

=== 2012 London Summer Olympics ===
At the 2012 London Summer Olympics, he beat Marcus Browne then he lost on points to 81 kg gold medallist Egor Mekhontsev of Russia in the last of his 180 amateur fights.

== Professional boxing career ==
=== Early stages ===
Before he made his debut in 2013, Hooper signed with Ricky Hatton's Hatton Promotions. By 2014 he had 9-0 record. Then momentum in Hooper's promising professional career stalled, with a first round knockout loss to Rob Powdrill on 8 November 2014.

=== Hooper vs. Salamov ===
In 2017, Hooper (12-1, 8KO) took on unbeaten Russian Umar Salamov (19-0, 14KO) on the undercard to the Pacquiao v Horn match and received a unanimous decision 96–94 on the judges' scorecards to win the WBO International light-heavyweight title and vacant IBF International light heavyweight title improving his record to 13-1.

=== Hooper vs. Quinlan ===
On 7 April 2018 at the Convention & Exhibition Centre in Brisbane, Australia, Quinlan stepped up to a weight division for a bout with long-time rival Renold Quinlan. He won by technical knockout in the ninth round.

== Professional boxing record ==
15 fights	14 wins	1 loss
By knockout	9	1
By decision	5	0

No.	Result	Record	Opponent	Type	Round, time	Date	Location	Notes
15	Win	14–1	(Australia) Renold Quinlan	TKO	9 (10)	24 May 2018	Brisbane Convention & Exhibition Centre, Brisbane, Australia	Retained WBO International light-heavyweight title
14	Win	13–1	(Russia) Umar Salamov	UD	10	2 Jul 2017	Suncorp Stadium, Brisbane, Australia	Won WBO International, and vacant IBF International light-heavyweight titles
13	Win	12–1	(Australia) Nader Hamdan	UD	8	2 Dec 2016	Luna Park, Sydney, Australia	
12	Win	11–1	(Australia) Kyle Brumby	UD	5	13 Aug 2016	The Melbourne Pavilion, Melbourne, Australia	
11	Win	10–1	(Philippines) Marlon Alta	UD	6	3 May 2015	Eatons Hill Hotel, Eatons Hill, Australia	
10	Loss	9–1	(Australia) Rob Powdrill	KO	1 (10), 0:21	8 Nov 2014	Sleeman Sports Complex, Brisbane, Australia	Lost WBC-EPBC light-heavyweight title
9	Win	9–0	(Australia) Joel Casey	KO	7 (10), 1:29	30 Jul 2014	Jupiters Hotel & Casino, Perth, Australia	Retained WBC Youth Silver light-heavyweight title; Won vacant WBC-EPBC light-heavyweight
8	Win	8–0	(Australia) Josh Webb	RTD	3 (6), 3:00	20 Jun 2014	Metro City, Perth, Australia	
7	Win	7–0	(South Korea) Young-Don Um	UD	6	19 Mar 2014	Jupiters Hotel & Casino, Gold Coast, Australia	
6	Win	6–0	(Thailand) Dechapon Suwunnalird	TKO	3 (6), 2:37	11 Dec 2013	The Melbourne Pavilion, Melbourne, Australia	
5	Win	5–0	(Thailand) Yodkhunsuk Mor Poowana	TKO	2 (10), 1:24	16 Nov 2013	Royal International Convention Centre, Brisbane, Australia	Won vacant WBC Youth Silver light-heavyweight title
4	Win	4–0	(Samoa) Togasilimai Letoa	KO	5 (6), 0:37	8 Aug 2013	Southport RSL Club, Gold Coast, Australia	
3	Win	3–0	(New Zealand) Viliami Toafi	TKO	1 (6), 2:47	5 Jul 2013	ABA Stadium, Auckland, New Zealand	
2	Win	2–0	(New Zealand) Kashif Mumtaz	TKO	1 (6), 1:04	9 May 2013	Royal International Convention Centre, Brisbane, Australia	
1	Win	1–0	(Australia) Garth Murray	KO	5 (6), 0:52	20 Apr 2013	Royal International Convention Centre, Brisbane, Australia	

== Personal life ==
Hooper's older brother Troy died in 2012 in a workplace accident, two months after he fought at the London Olympics. He traces his Indigenous family ancestry to the Kamilaroi people.

== Controversy ==
On 30 July, in London at the 2012 Summer Olympics, Hooper stepped into the ring for his Olympic bout wearing a T-shirt emblazoned with the Australian Aboriginal flag. The Australian Olympic Committee demanded he make a public apology. Wearing the shirt was said to have breached the Olympic Charter. "I'm not saying I don't care [if there are sanctions]. I'm just saying that I'm very proud of what I did," he said. "I'm Aboriginal, representing my culture, not only my country but all my people as well. That's what I wanted to do and I'm happy I did it." Although the Australian Olympic Committee criticised him, the IOC said they would take no action.

== Legal issues ==
In May 2014, Hooper was fined $1,750 after admitting slapping a taxi driver. In August 2014, he was granted immediate parole on an 18 month jail sentence after pleading guilty to spitting on a police officer. In September 2023, Hooper pleaded guilty to robbery with personal violence and was sentenced to 27 months in jail with immediate parole release. In December 2024, he was remanded in custody after being charged with rape.

Sporting positions
Regional boxing titles
New title	WBC Youth Silver light-heavyweight champion 16 November 2013 – 8 November 2014	Vacant Title next held by Liam Conroy
New title	WBC-EPBC light-heavyweight champion 30 July 2014 – 8 November 2014	Succeeded by Rob Powdrill
Vacant Title last held by Trent Broadhurst	IBF International light-heavyweight champion 2 Jul 2017 – April 2018	Vacant Title next held by Umar Salamov
Preceded by Umar Salamov	WBO International light-heavyweight champion 2 July 2017 – September 2018	Vacant Title next held by Umar Salamov
