= Victor Oganov =

Russian boxers

Victor Oganov (born August 11, 1976, in Syktyvkar, Komi ASSR, Russian SFSR) is a Russian professional boxer of Russian and Armenian descent.

== Career ==
Oganov was 64–16 as an amateur and turned pro as a super middleweight in Russia in 1998. He had a good start in Saint Petersburg, Russia with management team Tundra. In 2003 he went to Australia in search of more fights and soon found manager Kostya Tszyu. After one year, he left his team and joined a new manager-coach Jeff Fenech. Oganov won his first 26 fights by knockout. After his explosive American debut, in which he knocked out veteran Richard "The Alien" Grant, Oganov signed with Gary Shaw Productions LLC, promoted by famous boxing promoter Gary Shaw, for more fights in the United States and left Jeff Fenech. On September 1, 2007, in a match for the vacant IBO Super Middleweight title, he lost his title fight, being knocked out by Fulgencio Zuniga in the ninth round. He also lost by TKO to Andre Dirrell in 2008. He participated in Australian Contender Super Middleweight Series 2009 and left in fight 3, the semifinal.

He has trained with Dennis Bakhtov and Roman Karmazin, sparred Arthur Abraham, Danny Green, Paul Briggs, and Julio César González and is a good friend of boxer Vic "Raging Bull" Darchinyan.

Oganov now lives in Perth, Western Australia. He is married to his wife Svetlana, who is from the same birth-town of Syktyvkar, Russia. They have four children: Anna, born in 2000; Sam (Semyone) (2005); Maria (2012), and Michael (2015).
