= TSB Stadium =

Indoor stadium located in New Zealand

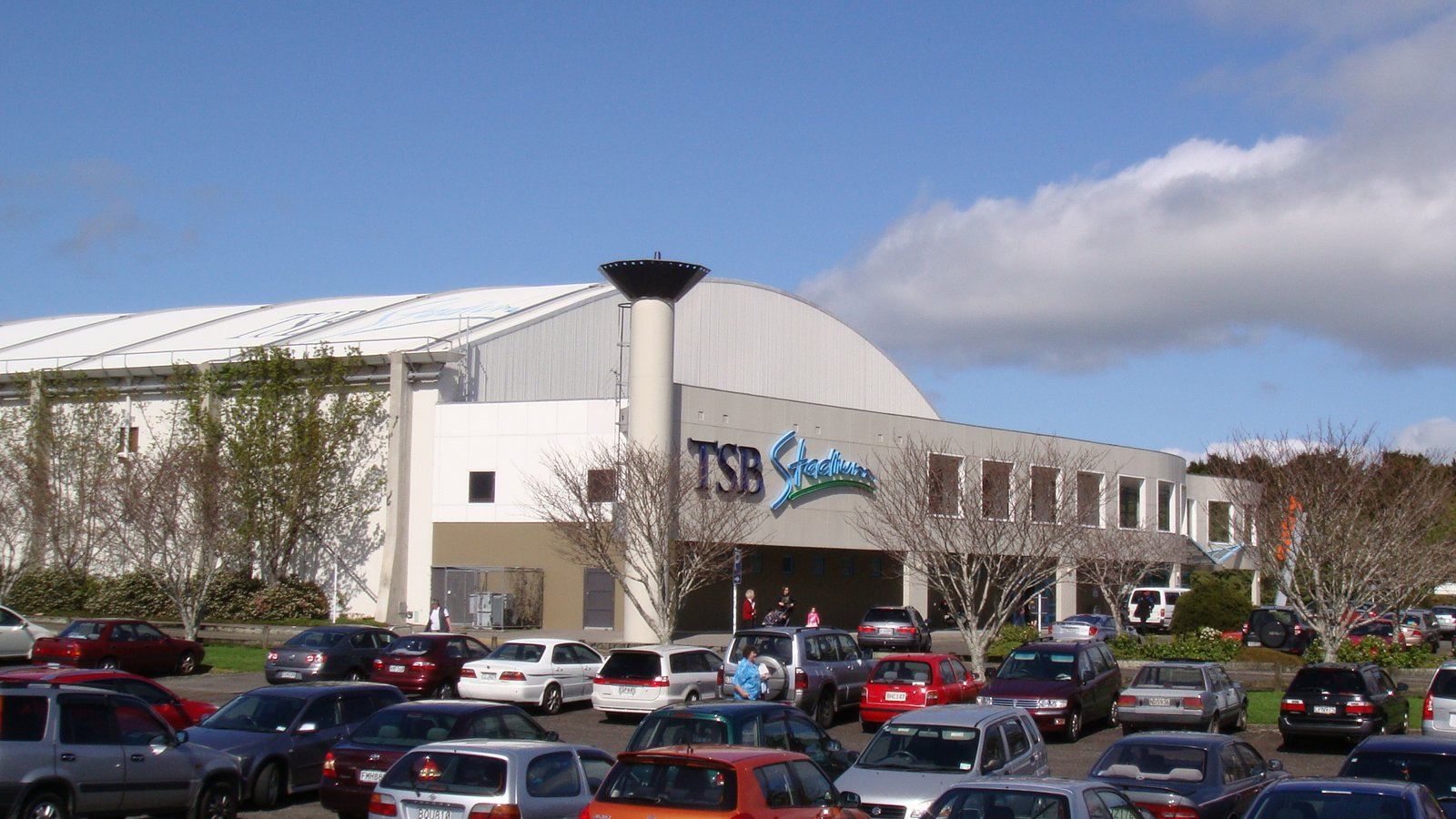
- Interactive map of TSB Stadium
- Location: New Plymouth, New Zealand
- Coordinates: 39°3′59″S 174°4′55″E
- Capacity: 3,518

Construction
- Opened: 1992

Tenant
- Taranaki Mountainairs

TSB Stadium is an indoor stadium located adjacent to Pukekura Park in New Plymouth, Taranaki, New Zealand, with vehicle access off Rogan Street.

== History ==
The stadium opened in 1992 and has hosted countless of sporting, cultural and commercial events since. Performers hosted at the stadium include Jimmy Barnes (1992), Split Enz (1993) Tina Turner (1997) Motorhead (2009) The Wiggles (2013) and Midnight Oil (2022).

It has also been an important community sport venue and hosted Taranaki NBL franchise teams with various names and sponsors which are now the Steelformers Taranaki Airs.

== Events ==
Events held at TSB Stadium include:

- Basketball New Zealand Breakers (ANBL)
- Music Shows – G-TARanaki Six60, INXS, Westlife, Beach Boys, Motorhead
- Trade Shows - Home and Lifestyle Expo, Careers Expo, Craft Shows, Oil and Gas Expos, NZ Tattoo and Art Festival
- School Careers Exhibitions
- Community indoor sports
