= Pan Asian Boxing Association =

Boxing organization

- Sport: Boxing
- Abbreviation: PABA
- Founded: 1995
- Affiliation: World Boxing Association
- Headquarters: Seoul, South Korea
- President: Hollywood Kim
- Vice president(s): Jung Koo Chang; Shahe Ali; Min Ki Kim; Stephan Zhang
- Secretary: Eric Yao
- Operating income: Title match sanction fee

Official website
- www.pabaproboxing.com
- (South Korea)

The Pan Asian Boxing Association, also known as PABA, is an organisation for professional boxing in the Central Asia, Oceania, Pan Pacific, Eurasia and Southeast and Far East nations. It was formed in 1995 and is headquartered in Seoul, South Korea.

== History ==
Since its inception in 1995 there have been over 800 sanctioned championship matches. Twenty two PABA champions have eventually been crowned as WBA world champions in their respective division, whilst PABA has assisted 37 PABA champions' challenge to the WBA world title. In March 2016, WBA voted at their annual convention to have WBA Oceania title to be the exclusive regional title for the Asia Pacific.

== Key people ==
PABA Structure

Position:	Name:	Nationality:
President	Hollywood Kim	(South Korea)
Vice President	Jung Koo Chang	(South Korea)
Vice President	Shahe Ali	(India)
Vice President	Min Ki Kim	(South Korea)
Vice President	Stephan Zhang	(China)
Secretary General	Eric Yao	(South Korea)

== Members and affiliates ==
PABA have 31 Regular Member Nations and 11 Associate Member Nations

=== Regular members ===
- Russian Federation Professional Boxing Federation
- Kazakhstan Professional Boxing Federation
- Kyrgyzstan Professional Boxing Federation
- Mongolia Boxing Commission
- Turkmenistan Professional Boxing Union
- China Boxing Association
- Uzbekistan Boxing Federation
- New Zealand Professional Boxing Association
- Tajikistan Professional Boxing Federation
- Thailand Boxing Commission
- Indonesia Board of Supervisory & Control for Professional Sports
- Australian National Boxing Federation
- Nepal Professional Boxing Commission
- Belarusian Professional Boxing Association
- Ukraine Professional Boxing League
- New Caledonia Boxing League
- Philippines Game and Amusements Board
- Tahiti (France) Polynesian Boxing Federation
- Fiji Boxing Association
- Moldova Boxing Federation
- DPR (Democratic People's Republic) of Korea Pro Boxing Association
- Tonga Boxing Association
- Papua New Guinea Boxing Association
- Samoa Boxing Association
- Armenia Professional Boxing Federation
- Indian Professional Boxing Association
- Macau Boxing Association
- Dutch (Netherlands) Professional Boxing Federation
- Korea Boxing Commission
- Romania Professional Boxing Council
- Czech Republic Professional Boxing Federation

=== Associate members ===
- IR Iran
- Bahrain
- Bhutan
- Vietnam
- Sri Lanka
- Nepal
- Pakistan
- Maldives
- Hong Kong
- Macau
- Nicaragua
- Argentina
- Cameroon
- Uganda
- Thailand
- Laos
- Kyrgyzstan
- Uzbekistan
- Kazakhstan
- Philippines
- United Arab Emirates
- Russia
- Dominican
- Brazil
- Australia
- New Zealand
- Indonesia
- Japan
- China
- Turkmenistan
- Tajikistan
- India
- Mongolia
- Namibia
- South Africa
- Cambodia
- Myanmar
- England
- Kenya
- Mexico
- Ghana
- Colombia
- Singapore
- Solomon Islands
- Tanzania
- United States Of America
- Vanuatu
- Venezuela
- Germany
- France
- Greece
- Spain
- Morocco
- Azerbaijan

== See also ==
- List of boxing organisations
