= Joseph Parker vs. Junior Fa =

2021 boxing match in New Zealand

Joseph Parker vs Junior Fa
- Date: 27 February 2021
- Venue: Spark Arena, Auckland, New Zealand
- Title on the line: WBO Oriental heavyweight title

Tale of the tape
Boxer	Joseph Parker	Junior Fa
Nickname	Lupesoliai La'auliolemalietoa	
Hometown	Auckland, New Zealand	Auckland, New Zealand
Pre-fight record	27–2	19–0
Height	6 ft 4 in (193 cm)	6 ft 5 in (196 cm)
Style	Orthodox	Orthodox
Recognition	Former WBO heavyweight champion WBO No. 3, WBC No. 6, and IBF No. 7 ranked heavyweight	WBO Oriental interim heavyweight champion WBO No. 6 ranked heavyweight

Result
- Parker defeats Fa by UD

Joseph Parker vs. Junior Fa was a heavyweight professional boxing match contested between former WBO champion Joseph Parker and WBO Oriental interim champion Junior Fa. The bout took place on 27 February 2021, at the Spark Arena in Auckland, New Zealand. The event was co-promoted by David Higgins of Duco Events, Eddie Hearn of Matchroom Boxing and Lou DiBella of DiBella Entertainment, and was considered a history making moment and New Zealand's next "Fight of the Century".

== Background ==
As well as growing up in the same neighbourhood in South Auckland and being members of the same church, Joseph Parker and Junior Fa have a history stretching back to their amateur days, having fought on four occasions with two wins each. Four years after making his professional debut, Parker won his first world title in December 2016 by defeating Andy Ruiz Jr. to capture the vacant WBO heavyweight title. After two successful defences Parker suffered his first professional defeat in March 2018, losing his title in a unification bout against reigning unified champion Anthony Joshua. Following the second loss of his career four months later against Dillian Whyte, Parker went on a three fight winning streak; defeating Alexander Flores in December 2018; Alex Leapai in June 2019; and Shawndell Winters in February 2020.

Junior Fa made his professional debut in 2016. Later that year he began plotting his path to fight against Parker. In 2017, Fa won the vacant New Zealand (NZPBA version) heavyweight title against Daniel Tai. The following year he won the WBO Oriental interim title against Luis Pascual to secure a world ranking. Between August 2018 and August 2019, the WBO consistently ranked Fa higher in the world rankings than Parker.

In September 2018, negotiations began between team Parker and team Fa for a potential fight in December 2018. The fight failed to materialise after the teams could not come to an agreement regarding the purse split, with Parker opting to fight Alexander Flores while Fa fought on the undercard against Rogelio Rossi. At the post-event press conference, Parker's trainer Kevin Barry "unleashed verbal blows" when the possibility of a Parker vs. Fa bout was mentioned. Stating, "It's a joke that he even gets mentioned in the same breath as Joe". Barry said that Fa had already been offered the fight, but, "he said no, I'd rather fight a guy who had seven fights in seven years and lost four of his last seven fights by knockout and who is 37-years-old, come on, give me a fricken break."

Talks between the teams resumed in early 2020, however, they quickly broke down after Parker claimed Fa's team "priced themselves out" while Fa's team reportedly claimed they were given a "lowball" offer. In August Fa's manager, Mark Keddell, said the fight was close to being agreed, stating, "We've sent our final offer to them today and in terms of the money I just cannot see it being a problem. We're talking pennies in the pound here. Junior is keen to fight. He wants to make it happen." On 5 October, New Zealand prime minister Jacinder Ardern announced that the COVID-19 lockdown for New Zealand was being lifted. The following day it was announced that the long-awaited bout is scheduled to take place on 11 December 2020 at the Spark Arena in Auckland.

A month before the fight it was announced that Junior Fa was not medically fit to compete. Junior Fa team saw that Fa wasn't doing so well doing training and energy levels, so they decided to get some bloods done. The fight doctor for the event Dr David Renata said the bloods were not normal and that Junior required surgery. Due to the show being postponed, some of the undercard that was scheduled to be on the show had to go elsewhere to keep their fights going. On 18 December it was announced that Junior Fa surgery was successful and the show was rescheduled for 27 February 2021.

== Fight card ==
Weight Class	Weight		vs.		Method	Round	Time	Notes
Heavyweight	200+ lbs.	(New Zealand) (Samoa) Joseph Parker	def.	(New Zealand) (Tonga) Junior Fa	UD	12		^{Note 1}
Heavyweight	200+ lbs.	(New Zealand) (Tonga) Hemi Ahio	def.	(New Zealand) (United States) Julius Long	KO	7 (8)	2:55
Cruiserweight	200 lbs.	(New Zealand) (Tonga) Panuve Helu	def.	(New Zealand) Nikolas Charalampous	SD	6		^Note 2
Cruiserweight	200 lbs.	(New Zealand) David Nyika	def.	(New Zealand) Jesse Maio	TKO	1 (4)	0.29
Light Heavyweight	200 lbs.	(New Zealand) (United Kingdom) Jerome Pampellone	def.	(New Zealand) Antz Amouta	TKO	1 (4)	2:57
Super Lightweight	140 lbs.	(New Zealand) Richie Hadlow	def.	(New Zealand) (Republic of the Congo) Obedi Maguchi	TKO	2 (4)	1:13
Light Heavyweight	175 lbs.	(New Zealand) (Samoa) John Parker	def.	(New Zealand) (Samoa) Egelani Taito	UD	4
Super Heavyweight	200+ lbs.	(New Zealand) Phil Telea	def.	(New Zealand) Niro Iuta	UD	3		^{Note 3}

^Note 1 For the vacant WBO Oriental Heavyweight title
^Note 2 Originally announced as Spit Decision draw, was later changed to a win to Panuve helu after all three judges failed to score a round correctly due to the referee deducting a point.
^Note 3 Corporate boxing bout

== Fight details ==
Joseph Parker vs. Junior Fa was held at the Spark Arena in Auckland, New Zealand. Tickets for the fight went on sale on 7 October after Duco Events announced that general admission tickets would start from a price of $69. Approximately 9,000 tickets went on sale to the general public. They had elected to go with Ticketmaster for distribution of sales. Corporate tables went on sale privately through Duco events themselves with prices ranging from $495 for a single seat to a maximum of $14,995 for a table of 10 in the front row.

Heading into the fight, Parker was looking for a fourth consecutive stoppage. The WBO ranked Parker at #2 and Fa at #6. Parker weighed 240.1 pounds and Fa scaled in heavier at 260.4 pounds.

The fight went the 12 round distance with Parker claiming the victory via unanimous decision. The judges scorecards read 115-113, 117-111 and 119-109. There was an expected crowd of 12,000 fans in attendance. With winning, Parker also captured the WBO Oriental heavyweight title. The fight began with both boxers trying to gain each others respect. Both landed power shots. The action was back and forth for the first few rounds. Parker and Fa managed to get the crowd on their feet with the action in the ring. The fight ended with more clinching which seemed to weaken the fight as it progressed. Fa was able to get his shots of during the clinches and Parker was more busy when there was no clinch. Referee John Conway did his job in separating the two many times throughout. In the last round, whilst in a clinch, Fa landed four uppercuts to Parker's head, repeatedly snapping his head back.

During the post-fight interviews, Parker praised Fa and his team, "Junior and his team did a great job. They came here to fight and it was a lot closer than we expected. Fa put on a great performance and had a great team behind him. That showed the ring rust, after over a year. Thank you to everyone for coming tonight." Fa talked about the cut, stating it was caused by an elbow. He also praised Parker, calling him a world class opponent. Fa felt he exposed Parker and his weaknesses and said he was the better boxer on the night.

=== Broadcasting ===
Duco events began a new partnership for this event with relatively new sports broadcaster Spark Sport and media company NZME. The fight was televised through a pay-per-view (PPV) produced by Spark Sport and Duco Events. Internationally across the world the event will be broadcast on DAZN. For New Zealand PPV prices began at $39.99 for people wishing to purchase of the event before 26 October. After that date the price goes up to $49.99 until 10 December. On 10 and 11 December the price will go up again to $59.99. David Higgins is aiming to break the New Zealand PPV record which is currently held by the last New Zealand Fight of the Century David Tua vs Shane Cameron. The second highest PPV record in New Zealand is held by Anthony Joshua vs. Joseph Parker and third with highest held by UFC 253 Israel Adesanya vs Paulo Costa.

International broadcasters
Country	Broadcaster
New Zealand	Spark Sport
Rest of the world	DAZN

== Aftermath ==
After the fight, it was announced that Parker had split from his trainer Kevin barry. Parker with the assistance of his friend Tyson Fury would sign up with a new trainer, Andy Lee. Parker would begin his rivalry with Derek Chisora after signing on with the new trainer.

Junior Fa would not return to the ring until June 2022 where he fought Lucas Browne. Junior Fa lost the fight by a devastating knockout.
