= Joseph Parker vs. Andy Ruiz Jr. =

Boxing competition

History
- Date: 10 December 2016
- Venue: Vector Arena, Auckland, New Zealand
- Title on the line: WBO heavyweight title

Tale of the tape
Boxer	(New Zealand) Joseph Parker	(United States) Andy Ruiz Jr.
Nickname		"The Destroyer"
Hometown	Auckland, Auckland Region, New Zealand	Imperial, California, U.S.
Pre-fight record	21–0 (18 KO)	29–0 (19 KO)
Age	24 years, 11 months	27 years, 2 months
Height	6 ft 4 in (193 cm)	6 ft 2 in (188 cm)
Weight	246 3/4 lb (112 kg)	255 3/4 lb (116 kg)
Style	Orthodox	Orthodox
Recognition	WBO; No. 1 Ranked Heavyweight; The Ring/TBRB; No. 6 Ranked Heavyweight	WBO; No. 3 Ranked Heavyweight; The Ring; No. 10 Ranked Heavyweight

Result
- Parker wins by majority decision (115–113, 115–113, 114–114)

Joseph Parker vs. Andy Ruiz Jr., billed as History, was a professional boxing match between undefeated Joseph Parker and Andy Ruiz Jr. for the vacant WBO heavyweight title. The event took place on 10 December 2016, at the Vector Arena in Auckland, New Zealand. Parker won the contest by majority decision, with two judges scoring it 115–113 and the other 114–114.

== History ==
=== Background ===
In late October, the Parker vs. Ruiz Jr. world title fight had been officially sanctioned by the World Boxing Organization. The organisation had granted permission to Parker fighting Ruiz Jr. for their belt with their championship committee voting unanimously in favor of the title fight. The belt was vacated by Tyson Fury, who was battling depression and drug issues and hadn't fought since November when he beat Wladimir Klitschko to snare the WBA (Super), IBF, WBO, IBO, and The Ring magazine titles. Although the WBO president Francisco Varcarcel said his preference was to set up a four-man box-off for the vacant title involving the four top-ranked available contenders for the title, it subsequently went down the route of their own rule book which gave number one ranked Parker the first rights to challenge. With number two ranked Klitschko targeting the WBA belt, it cleared the way for number three Ruiz Jr., to step up against Parker.

Discussions and negotiations began after Fury was expected to be stripped of his WBO title over inactivity and testing positive for cocaine. With his sudden announcement that he would relinquish his heavyweight world titles due to his issues with various problems, it was unclear exactly how the WBA, and WBO would go about filling the vacancies. Before Fury vacated, Duco Events promoter Dean Lonergan announced in early October that he had been negotiating an alternative WBO title fight against Ruiz Jr., suggesting he had a chance of reaching a deal with promoter Bob Arum. He pointed out that the WBO rules state that the two best classified contenders will challenge for the title. Arum told ESPN.com that he was in talks with the WBO about making it for the vacant title. He also said his experience dealing with Parker and his team has so far been a pleasure.

Parker and Ruiz Jr. also had their previous encounters. It had been well-documented that the last time they met was during a sparring session in Las Vegas two years prior, Ruiz was said to have rattled the jaw of Parker so badly that he could not eat properly for three days. Parker said that his trainer Kevin Barry was looking for work for him. Ruiz Jr. had a lot more experience than himself and that he had underestimated Ruiz because of his size during their sparring session.

=== Controversy ===
Several issues occurred before the fight was announced. One was the proposed date, with 10 December date preferred by Parker's handlers, Duco Events, and Ruiz preferring the fight to be held in January. The 10 December date was eventually agreed upon.

There was also speculation that the fight would be moved overseas when Auckland Council turned down Duco's bid for public funding. This meant that there was a chance the contest would be held in California, with Ruiz's promoter Arum giving Duco a seven-day deadline to find the supposed shortfall of several hundred thousand dollars. Sponsorship was provided by TAB, Gallagher, and Burger King. Martin Snedden said the price of hosting the fight was around $4 million mark, and that this had not been reached despite the sponsor backing.

== Fight card ==
Weight Class	Weight		vs.		Method	Round	Time	Notes
Heavyweight	200+ lbs.	(New Zealand) Joseph Parker	def.	(United States) Andy Ruiz Jr.	MD	12/12	3:00	^{Note 1}
Heavyweight	200+ lbs.	(New Zealand) Junior Fa	def.	(Argentina) Pablo Matías Magrini	TKO	3/8	0:55
Heavyweight	200+ lbs.	(New Zealand) David Letele	def.	(New Zealand) Che Barlow	TKO	4/4	2:12	^{Note 2}
Catchweight	207 lbs.	(New Zealand) John Parker	def.	(New Zealand) Ash McConville	UD	4/4	3:00
Welterweight	147 lbs.	(Australia) Jeff Horn	def.	(South Africa) Ali Funeka	TKO	6/10	0:30	^{Note 3}
Super bantamweight	122 lbs.	(Ghana) Isaac Dogboe	def.	(Argentina) Julián Evaristo Aristule	TKO	7/10	1:15	^{Note 4}
Super bantamweight	122 lbs.	(Australia) Shannon O'Connell	def.	(Argentina) Laura Soledad Griffa	UD	8/8	2:00	^{Note 5}

^Note 1 For vacant WBO heavyweight title
^Note 2 Pre broadcast bout. Non-televised
^Note 3 For WBO Inter-Continental welterweight title
^Note 4 For WBO Latin and International super-bantamweight title
^Note 5 For WBO Asia Pacific super-bantamweight title

== Details ==
Joseph Parker vs. Andy Ruiz Jr. was held at the Vector Arena in Auckland, New Zealand. Tickets for the fight went on sale on 10 November after Duco Events announced that general admission tickets would start from a price of $99. Approximately 8,000 tickets went on sale to the general public. They had elected to go with Ticketmaster for distribution of sales. Meanwhile, Chief Executive Martin Snedden told Fairfax up to 85% of available seating zones, which feature 124 corporate tables seating ten clients along as well as eleven elevated boxes that could accommodate fifteen to twenty people, had already been purchased by corporates for the fight. Although the event was jointly promoted by Duco Events and Top Rank, Duco Events were the lead promoter of the fight.

Tony Weeks served as the referee, and Ramon Cerdan, Salven Lagumbay and Ingo Barrabas were the ringside judges. Four national anthems were sung. The U.S. national anthem, "The Star-Spangled Banner", and Samoa national anthem, "The Banner of Freedom", was performed by Pene Pati of Sol3 Mio. The Mexican national anthem, "Himno Nacional Mexicano", was performed by Marco-Antonio Muniz. The New Zealand national anthem, "God Defend New Zealand", was performed by New Zealand singer Sophie Morris. The announcer of the night was Daniel Hennessey.

=== Broadcasting ===
As Parker had exclusive relationships with the broadcaster of Sky at the time of the fight, the telecast of the fight was aired on Sky Arena in New Zealand. The fight was televised through a pay-per-view (PPV) produced by Sky and Duco Events. Sixteen days out from the fight, Duco Events revealed it would cost New Zealand television viewers NZD$59.95 for the sporting event at Auckland's Vector Arena as it featured on Sky Arena. The broadcast of the fight is said to stretch into 100 countries.

In Samoa, a free broadcast of the fight had been made possible through a partnership between Digicel Samoa and Apia Broadcasting Limited, owners of TV3. Digicel Samoa chief executive Rory Condon, TV3 owner Hans Joe Keil and TV3 managing director Verona Parker officially announced the partnership with a sponsorship of the broadcast worth approximately WS$30,000 tālā. BoxNation confirmed via Twitter they would live stream the event on their website and television for their subscribers. ESPN and Fox Sports were the main broadcasters that aired the fight in Brazil, Latin America and many Caribbean countries, while BBC Online streamed the fight in all United Kingdom territories.

== The fight ==
In round one, both Parker and Ruiz were feeling each other out as they fought at a calm pace. Round two saw Ruiz land multiple combinations on Parker and was his best of the fight as he pushed him back against the ropes where Parker didn’t have any response. Ruiz, seemingly taking some of the early rounds loss his momentum as Parker soon adjusted fighting on the back foot and took most of the mid rounds. In round six, Parker landed a hard right hand which Ruiz responded later with body shots. For the next few rounds it was like a chess match where both were going back and forth having their moments. In round eight, Ruiz put Parker back on the ropes. Parker landed multiple head shots in the center of the ring where Ruiz responded more heavy shots to the head as well though one shot was landed hard at the back of Parker’s head the referee Tony Weeks didn’t say anything. Round nine was arguably Parker’s best round as he picked his shots well and let his jab land more. In the final round with the fight in balance, Ruiz was coming forward at regular pace and still making the fight aggressive while Parker still in the back foot jabbing at distance and landing his own combinations. At the end of the round Parker finished with a body and head combination and ended it with a few jabs to Ruiz’s face. Afterwards, Parker won a Majority Decision over Ruiz Jr. with scores of 114–114, 115–113, 115–113.

Prime broadcast a documentary special called Parker v Ruiz Jr: A Fighting Chance, focusing on the two fighters as part of the lead-up to the fight. Sky also aired the programme. It included past Parker fights, coverage of their lives outside of boxing, and special interviews with both their trainers and surrounding media experts, including commentator Bob Sheridan.

The following afternoon of the fight, Sky television announced that they were taking legal action against a large number of people for streaming the event online illegally. It was estimated that the number of streamers reached into the triple digits. The broadcaster and promoter Duco Events have been battling to stop people illegally streaming Parker's fights. The day before, a court ruled against seven individuals found to have unlawfully streamed July's fight between Parker and Solomon Haumono. The judge found each of the seven had infringed Sky's copyright, granted an injunction restraining any further infringements and ordered each defendant to destroy any copies and pay nominal damages of NZD$100 as well as costs of NZD$2,670.

International broadcasters
Country	Broadcaster
Australia	Fox Sports
Australia	Seven Network
Brazil	ESPN
Brazil	Fox Sports
New Zealand	Sky Arena
United Kingdom	BBC Online
United Kingdom	BoxNation
United States	HBO
Samoa	TV3

=== Belt ===
The winner of the fight received the world championship belt by the WBO. The belt, valued at around $5000, is red with gold-plated motifs and encrusted crystals. It features the names of the two fighters and the bout details. After the belt arrived in New Zealand, it toured Hamilton, Tauranga, Rotorua, Hastings, Palmerston North, Wellington, Nelson, Christchurch, Invercargill, Dunedin, New Plymouth and Whangārei. It was displayed at the premises of fight sponsors Burger King in those cities.

Ruiz handled the belt during a promotion event, saying feeling the prize gave him motivation for the fight. Parker did not touch the belt during the same event.

== Recap ==
=== Aftermath ===
After the fight, Ruiz Jr. showed interest in a possible rematch. With many criticism over who was the winner, he had a valid case in regards to believing he dominated large periods of the contest. Although no rematch clause was included in the contract. Parker's camp showed very minimal interest in giving Ruiz another shot when a path towards bigger fights in England could be possible. Ruiz Jr.’s trainer, Abel Sanchez, supported his boxer's call for a rematch.

A lot of criticism surfaced, believing Parker had lost the fight. Parker's promoters were disappointed on what they heard, saying some of the most vocal critics have been bitter towards Parker's success from early in his career. Duco's David Higgins said the criticism was "crap", and that the public deserved to be told the full story. Some, most notably New Zealand Professional Boxing Association president Lance Revill, described the majority decision by the WBO-appointed independent judges as "bullshit", with Revill adding he was embarrassed to be a New Zealander after watching the fight. Rather than score the fight close, Revill had it 118–111 to Ruiz. Most experts ruled it a close Parker win or draw. After his comments, Revill resigned as president of the NZPBA, stating that "I was getting criticised by members of my own association who were saying 'Lance is out of line' and saying I shouldn't be saying that as president. Well, if I can't say it as president, who can say it? I want to be able to say what I like and speak my mind because I don't like the way boxing has been run at the moment."

=== Scorecard ===
Salven Lagumbay		Ramon Cerdan		Ingo Barrabas	
Parker	Ruiz	Parker	Ruiz	Parker	Ruiz
114	114	115	113	115	113

Preceded by vs. Alexander Dimitrenko	Joseph Parker's bouts 10 December 2016	Succeeded by vs. Răzvan Cojanu
Preceded by vs. Franklin Lawrence	Andy Ruiz Jr.'s bouts 10 December 2016	Succeeded by vs. Devin Vargas
