= Dean Lonergan =

New Zealand international rugby league player & boxing promoter

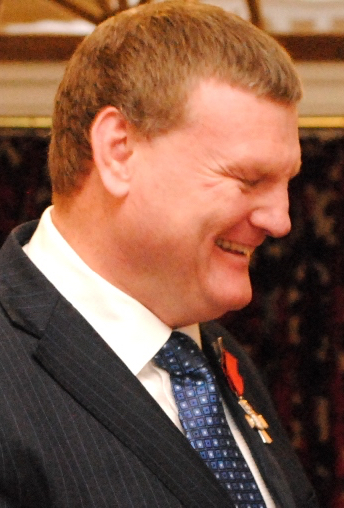
- Lonergan in 2012

Personal information
- Full name: Dean Robert Lonergan
- Born: 28 August 1965 (age 61)

Playing information
- Height: 6 ft 2 in (1.88 m)
- Weight: 16 st 0 lb (102 kg)
- Position: Second-row
Club
Years	Team	Pld	T	G	FG	P
	City-Newton Dragons
19??–89	Glenora Bears
1988	Canberra Raiders	4	0	0	0	0
1989	Rochdale Hornets
1986–87	Bramley RLFC	8	0	0	0	0
	Total	12	0	0	0	0
Representative
Years	Team	Pld	T	G	FG	P
1986–91	Auckland
1986–91	New Zealand	15	4	0	0	16

Dean Robert Lonergan MNZM (born 28 August 1965) played international rugby league for New Zealand before becoming a boxing promoter and events organiser. He was a second-row forward and appeared in 11 Tests between 1987 and 1991. He organised the televised charity boxing events known as Fight for Life. Questions about the fees charged by his company attracted media attention in 2003. Between 2010 and 2017 he was a partner of David Higgins at Duco Events, which promoted Joseph Parker and Jeff Horn, who won the WBO heavyweight and welterweight titles respectively. He subsequently established D & L Events with his son Liam. Its fighters included Jai Opetaia, Mea Motu and Lani Daniels. Its Australian television arrangement ended without renewal in 2022. Several of the company's leading fighters later moved on. In 2024 the Supreme Court of Queensland found that D & L Events had repudiated its agreement with Opetaia and dismissed its claim for damages.

== Rugby League Career ==
Lonergan represented the New Zealand national rugby league team from 1986 to 1991 and also represented Auckland. He played for the Glenora Bears and City Newton Dragons in the Auckland Rugby League competition and the Canberra Raiders in the NSWRL Premiership. He spent 1989 with the Rochdale Hornets in England.

In a Test match against Australia in Melbourne in 1991, Lonergan clashed famously with Kangaroo forward Steve Roach and had to be carried from the field. However he returned to the field and New Zealand won the match.

Warriors

Lonergan was a board member of the Auckland Warriors from 1996 until 1997.

== Boxing ==
=== Beginning of Fight for Life, Shane Cameron 2000 - 2008 ===
Lonergan was organising Fight for Life by 2001. The televised charity boxing events paired rugby players and other public figures in bouts. From 2001 to 2003 it raised money for the Yellow Ribbon youth suicide awareness trust, which reported net proceeds of about $600,000, $1 million and $400,000 from the three events. The Meningitis Trust said it received $833,000 from the 2004 event.

The June 2002 event was announced as having raised $1 million for Yellow Ribbon. In February 2003 theWeekend Herald reported that total income had been $1.9 million. According to the newspaper, DeanLonergan Events received $411,000 in management fees after operating expenses of roughly $520,000.The company was entitled to 30 per cent of the balance after costs under an agreement with the trust. That arrangement had not previously been made public. Lonergan subsequently contributed approximately $40,000 to bring the trust's receipt to $1 million. Advertising had stated that all proceeds would go to Yellow Ribbon.

The Fundraising Institute of New Zealand questioned percentage-based fees, while the trust's acting chairman, Marco Marinkovich, considered the fee fair. Lonergan said only the $1 million had been announced "because that is what the charity gets", acknowledged that the fee arrangement had causedconfusion, and said he would "clean it up" for the next event. Questions about the distribution of money arose again after the August 2003 event. Critics contrasted reported expenses of approximately $900,000 with a charitable payment of about $400,000.

Lonergan responded at a press conference with his own breakdown: $1,423,923 in gross income, $663,502 in operating expenses against a $487,000 budget, and a $195,000 fee for his company. On those figures, $565,421 remained for Yellow Ribbon and Youthline. He said his company had returned $64,000 of its fee, raising the charities' share to $629,421. Separately, his company was paid $45,000 for helping to produce an accompanying television series and received a $100,000 broadcast fee from TV3, as co-owner of the series rights. Yellow Ribbon's share was about $400,000. Yellow Ribbon subsequently withdrew from Fight for Life, saying it intended to concentrate on fundraising in the community.

In 2005 Marinkovich attributed the split to government concern that linking boxing with suicide prevention was unsafe; he said Lonergan had refused requests to cut ties with the trust, and continued to defend him. The government's former youth suicide prevention co-ordinator said Lonergan had changed later events in line with her suggestions. In a 2011 profile, Lonergan said the criticism had changed how he explained the financial arrangements for charity events. He estimated his charitable contributions at between $4.5 million and $5 million.

In June 2007 he staged his first professional boxing promotion, with Shane Cameron topping the bill.

=== Duco Events 2009 - 2017 ===
In 2009 Lonergan joined Duco Events as head of corporate sales, becoming co-promoter and co-owner alongside founder David Higgins. Duco's first major event, David Tua vs Shane Cameron in October 2009, sold about 7,500 tickets and 88,000 pay-per-view purchases.

Duco continued to stage Fight for Life events. The December 2011 event, headlined by Cameron against Monty Betham, cost about $1.3 million and raised $166,000 for prostate cancer awareness.

After Cameron was cut in the December 2013 Fight for Life main event against Brian Minto, Cameron and his manager Ken Reinsfield criticised the organisers for not having a registered doctor available. The replacement doctor, retired Scottish doctor Brian Stuart, declined to stitch Cameron and had no medical equipment, and Cameron was later stitched at his home by Dr Dave Renata. Lonergan said Cameron was never in danger and had been offered an ambulance to hospital, and accepted that things could have been handled better.

Duco signed Joseph Parker for his professional debut in 2012 and Australian Jeff Horn in 2014. In 2013 Duco offered rugby player Sonny Bill Williams a $1 million purse to fight Parker; Williams did not accept. In 2015 columnist Joseph Romanos criticised the quality of the opponents Parker was being matched with.

Parker won the vacant WBO heavyweight title against Andy Ruiz Jr. in Auckland in December 2016; beforehand, Lonergan said the cost of staging the fight in New Zealand meant it could make a financial loss. Duco began promoting in Australia in April 2016 with a card headlined by Horn, and in July 2017 Horn beat Manny Pacquiao for the WBO welterweight title at a Brisbane event financed in part by the city and the Queensland government.

In May 2017 Lonergan and Higgins announced they were ending their partnership. The separation became protracted, with the two unable to agree terms; Lonergan took the Australian operation and Horn, while Higgins kept the New Zealand business and Parker.

=== D & L Events (2018-2024) ===
Lonergan founded D & L Events with his son Liam in 2018. D & L's first promotion was the November2018 fight at Suncorp Stadium, where Horn knocked out Anthony Mundine. During the promotion Mundine, responding to Lonergan's predictions about the fight, called him a "despicable human being". In November 2018, Horn's official social media accounts carried posts referring to earlier remarks by Mundine about homosexuality. They also proposed that gay and transgender people appear alongside ring card girls at the fight, subject to Mundine's agreement. The posts, and a related newspaper article, drew criticism for using sexuality as a promotional device. Horn said the posts had been made without consulting him, that they made it look as though he had said those things, and that this was damaging to his reputation; he removed his promoters' access to his accounts, had the posts taken down and said he could leave them if it happened again. Lonergan took responsibility for the posts, and Horn said his promoters had apologised and undertaken that it would not happen again.

In July 2022, Jai Opetaia, then promoted by D & L Events, defeated Mairis Briedis to win the IBF and TheRing cruiserweight titles. D & L Events had been contracted by Fox Sports to produce shows forbroadcast on Foxtel and the Main Event pay-per-view service; that agreement expired on 31 December2022 and was not renewed. In February 2023 heavyweight Justis Huni moved to Matchroom Boxing. Opetaia had signed D & L Events, a company controlled by Lonergan, as his exclusive promoter in August 2019. After the Fox Sports agreement ended, Lonergan sought arrangements under which other promoters would stage Opetaia's mandatory title defence and subsequent fights in the United Kingdom. He described the change in court as a "pivot", saying that the loss of the broadcast agreement had been a major factor.

Opetaia terminated the contract on 20 February 2023, and D & L Events sued him in the Supreme Court of Queensland. In March 2023 Justice Martin Burns refused D & L Events' application for an injunction to stop Opetaia signing with another promoter before trial. At trial, D & L Events relied on an expert report valuing its lost earnings from three proposed fights in the United Kingdom at about A$1.33 million. On 11 October 2024, Justice Cooper ruled against D & L Events. He found that D & L Events had repudiated the contract by seeking to require Opetaia, without his agreement, to fight in overseas bouts promoted by others. Opetaia was therefore entitled to terminate the contract. The court rejected two alternative arguments advanced by Opetaia: that the loss of the Fox Sports agreement breached an implied contractual term, and that Lonergan's alleged misrepresentations had induced him to sign. Had the repudiation argument failed, the court said it would have assessed D & L Events' damages at A$650,000. D & L Events received no damages. On 6 November 2024 the court rejected D & L Events' submission that it should pay only 70 per cent of Opetaia's legal costs and ordered it to pay his costs of the proceeding in full, describing his success as complete.

Fight for Life returned in New Zealand in July 2022, with Lonergan signing several Peach Boxing fighters, among them Jerome Pampellone, Andrei Mikhailovich and Mea Motu. Motu won the IBO super bantamweight title in the event's first female main event in 2023, and IBF heavyweight champion Lani Daniels also fought on his cards. In February 2024, D & L Events released the Peach Boxing fighters, who signed with Australian promoter No Limit Boxing. The New Zealand Herald reported that the decision had been made by the Cook family, which owned half of D & L Events, after losses the newspaper understood to be about $2 million over the previous two years. Lonergan told the Herald "I won't deny that... it's a lot", describing the money as an investment in the fighters, and said the company would continue to operate with its bills paid.

=== Other business ===
Lonergan produced the touring show Cirque Rocks in 2006. He later said the production cost about $2.5 million but brought in only $1.5 million. Combined with losses on other projects, the shortfall contributed to debts of about $1.8 million. He said he negotiated with creditors and repaid the debt over four years. With Higgins he spent two years developing the NRL Auckland Nines, a tournament involving all 16NRL clubs first held at Eden Park in 2014, which Auckland's council events agency estimated added $9.35 million to the city's GDP in its first year. Duco's assets also included the Brisbane Global Rugby Tens.

=== Media ===
Lonergan was a columnist for NZ Herald. He was also a radio announcer for multiple radio stations, mostly focused on Sports.

=== Politics ===
Following the resignation of Robert Muldoon, Lonergan stood in the 1992 Tamaki by-election for a seat in the 43rd New Zealand Parliament, as a stunt for Radio Hauraki. Of 14 candidates, he came sixth with 105 votes with the percentage of 0.60% .

== Honours ==
In the 2012 Queen's Birthday and Diamond Jubilee Honours, Lonergan was appointed a Member of the New Zealand Order of Merit for services to sport and philanthropy.
