= Sky Arena =

- Country: New Zealand

Programming
- Language: English
- Picture format: 1080i (HDTV) 16:9

Ownership
- Owner: Sky Network Television

History
- Launched: 1 March 2011; 14 years ago

Links
- Website: Official Site

Sky Arena is a pay-per-view company operated in New Zealand by Sky Network Television. Until 2015 Sky Arena was also spin-off event promoter company jointly owned by Sky and VADR Media. Sky Arena screens events on such as professional wrestling, mixed martial arts, boxing and concerts. The David Tua vs Monte Barrett during August 2011 was the first Sky Arena event screened in 1080i high-definition. The biggest event in PPV New Zealand history was David Tua vs Shane Cameron. The event has the record with the most buys with 88,000 buys in New Zealand. The channel previously screened WWE pay-per-view events until January 2022, when Sky's pay-per-view rights agreement ended with WWE.

== Current pay-per-views ==
- DAZN Boxing (rights shared with DAZN)
- UFC (rights shared with Spark Sport)
