= Sophie Morris =

New Zealand singer

Sophie Morris is a New Zealand singer, actor and presenter who performs within New Zealand and internationally. She was the first ever female to tour with The Ten Tenors, joining the group on their 'Wish You Were Here' Tour in 2018.

== Early life ==
Morris was born and raised in Dunedin. She began singing aged 10 as Gretl in The Sound of Music. She attended St Hilda's Collegiate School where she was Arts Prefect. She trained in classical and contemporary voice at the University of Otago, gaining a Master's in music, as well as a Bachelor of Commerce in marketing.

== Career ==
Morris performs as a singer, actor and presenter.

Musical theatre roles performed include Jellylorum in Cats, Rapunzel in Into the Woods, Sophie in Mamma Mia and Sandy in Grease.

New Zealand events performed at include Coca-Cola Christmas in the Park, the APRA Awards and Cruise for a Cause on Milford Sound.

She has performed sell-out nights of her own shows Sophie Goes to Broadway and Sophie Morris on Stage. She released her debut album Sophie Morris – Songs from the Stage in 2018.

Morris performed Christmas carols for passengers on an Air New Zealand flight on Christmas Day in 2015 when returning to Dunedin to see her family.

Morris presents as a newsreader, host, guest lecturer, guest speaker and narrator. She was a regular newsreader on Channel 39 and is often invited to speak about her career, the performance industry and provide advice and motivation.

During the COVID-19 pandemic in New Zealand, Morris created a show "Sophie Morris – Songs and Stories from the Stage" which was broadcast in a live stream from her living room. The show shared stories and music from her adventures as a performer. Proceeds of the performance went to Pet Refuge, a New Zealand charity.

== National Anthems ==
Morris has performed for many sporting events including the T20 Black Clash (with past and present members of the All Blacks and Black Caps), the Joseph Parker v Andy Ruiz WBO World Heavyweight Championship Title Fight, The Oceania Cup (Great Britain Rugby League Lions v Kiwis), the Rugby League Four Nations and the Bledisloe Cup.

During the COVID-19 lockdown in New Zealand, Morris performed the Australian and New Zealand national anthems for television broadcast on ANZAC Day for viewers to sing along with at home in an ANZAC Day Tribute.

Morris sang the Australian national anthem before the 2026 A-League Men Grand Final at Go Media Stadium, Auckland.

== Screen work ==
Morris played the role of Kaz McCarthy on New Zealand soap TV show Shortland Street in 2022.

== MC ==
Morris was involved with the 2023 FIFA Women's World Cup as a master of ceremonies.

She is a radio host on More FM Rodney.
