= Shawndell Winters =

American boxer

Personal information
- Nickname: Dell
- Nationality: American
- Born: Shawndell Terell Winters; November 5, 1980 (age 46)
- Height: 6 ft 2 in (188 cm)
- Weight: Heavyweight

Boxing career
- Stance: Orthodox

Boxing record
- Total fights: 20
- Wins: 13
- Win by KO: 12
- Losses: 7

Shawndell Terell Winters (born November 5, 1980) is an American professional boxer. He has held the WBA-NABA heavyweight title since 2019. Winters had a late start to boxing, turning professional in the sport at 34 years of age. As an amateur, he competed at the National Golden Gloves on two occasions. In 2014 he placed second after losing to DeRae Crane and in 2012 he suffered an early defeat thus missing out on qualification into the quarterfinals. In February 2020, Winters received his first ever appearance in one of the four major sanctioning bodies rankings by the WBA.

== Professional career ==
In July 2016, Winters was confirmed to fight former Ghanaian olympian Maxwell Amponsah as the co-main event in Hammond, Indiana. He recorded a dominant fifth-round knockout after a right-hand staggered Amponsah before Winters finished with a flurry of punches that left his opponent face down on the canvas. The bout was immediately waved off for medical attention. The following year Winters fought in Elk Grove Village where he suffered his first defeat in an upset victory for Brian Howard. Winters redeemed himself after winning three consecutive knockout victories over Raymond Gray, Joe Jones, and Ryan Soft before receiving an eight-round majority decision loss in his second fight overseas against Nikodem Jeżewski.

Winters recorded an upset technical knockout win over undefeated heavyweight Oleksandr Teslenko in Brampton, Ontario on the latest United Boxing Promotions card. He landed an overhand right and began connecting many more combination punches until the referee intervened. Winters became the new North American Boxing Association champion. He then fought during November in Poland against Sergiej Werwejko. Winters produced a solid performance by dropping and outclassing Werwejko in the seventh round. In February 2020, it was announced Winters would fight former heavyweight world champion Joseph Parker in Frisco, Texas on the undercard of Mikey Garcia versus Jessie Vargas.

== Professional boxing record ==
20 fights	13 wins	7 losses
By knockout	12	4
By decision	1	3

No.	Result	Record	Opponent	Type	Round, time	Date	Location	Notes
20	Loss	13–7	Simon Kean	TKO	9 (10), 1:25	Feb 19, 2022	Montreal Casino, Montreal, Canada	
19	Loss	13–6	Cassius Chaney	UD	10	Aug 14, 2021	The Palladium, Worcester, Massachusetts, U.S.	
18	Loss	13–5	Roberto Nafate	UD	6	Mar 26, 2021	Salon de Eventos, Matamoros, Mexico	
17	Loss	13–4	Alen Babić	TKO	2 (8), 2:20	Aug 22, 2020	Matchroom Sport Headquarters, Brentwood, England	
16	Loss	13–3	Joseph Parker	TKO	5 (10), 2:40	Feb 29, 2020	Ford Center at The Star, Frisco, Texas, U.S.	
15	Win	13–2	Sergiej Werwejko	TKO	7 (10), 0:40	Nov 23, 2019	Sports Hall MOSiR, Radom, Poland	
14	Win	12–2	Oleksandr Teslenko	TKO	5 (10), 2:39	Sep 14, 2019	CAA Centre, Brampton, Canada	Won WBA-NABA heavyweight title
13	Loss	11–2	Nikodem Jeżewski	MD	8	Apr 6, 2019	Spodek, Katowice, Poland	
12	Win	11–1	Ryan Soft	KO	1 (4), 2:58	Dec 8, 2018	McBride Hall, Gary, Indiana, U.S.	
11	Win	10–1	Joe Jones	KO	5 (6), 1:25	Nov 10, 2018	Horseshoe Casino, Hammond, Indiana, U.S.	
10	Win	9–1	Raymond Gray	KO	1 (6), 2:31	Aug 25, 2018	Dr. Martin Luther King, Jr. Community Center, Milwaukee, Wisconsin, U.S.	
9	Loss	8–1	Brian Howard	KO	2 (6), 1:06	Oct 27, 2017	Belvedere Event Center, Elk Grove Village, Illinois, U.S.	
8	Win	8–0	Maxwell Amponsah	KO	5 (6), 2:25	Jul 30, 2016	Horseshoe Casino, Hammond, Indiana, U.S.	
7	Win	7–0	Misael Sanchez	KO	1 (4), 2:53	Dec 19, 2015	Billar El Perro Salado, Tijuana, Mexico	
6	Win	6–0	Joey Montoya	UD	4	Nov 25, 2015	Horseshoe Casino, Hammond, Indiana, U.S.	
5	Win	5–0	Tommonte Jefferson	TKO	1 (4), 0:23	Oct 9, 2015	Riverside Ballroom, Green Bay, Wisconsin, U.S.	
4	Win	4–0	Skylar Thompson	TKO	1 (4), 1:18	Oct 3, 2015	National Guard Armory, Hammond, Indiana, U.S.	
3	Win	3–0	PJ Cajigas	TKO	2 (4), 2:14	Sep 19, 2015	Tripoli Shrine Center, Milwaukee, Wisconsin, U.S.	
2	Win	2–0	Ronez McGrady	TKO	2 (4), 2:29	Aug 22, 2015	Horseshoe Casino, Hammond, Indiana, U.S.	
1	Win	1–0	Michael Perez	TKO	1 (4), 1:31	May 16, 2015	Horseshoe Casino, Hammond, Indiana, U.S.	

Regional boxing titles
Preceded by Oleksandr Teslenko	NABA heavyweight champion September 14, 2019 – present	Incumbent
