= Duco Events =

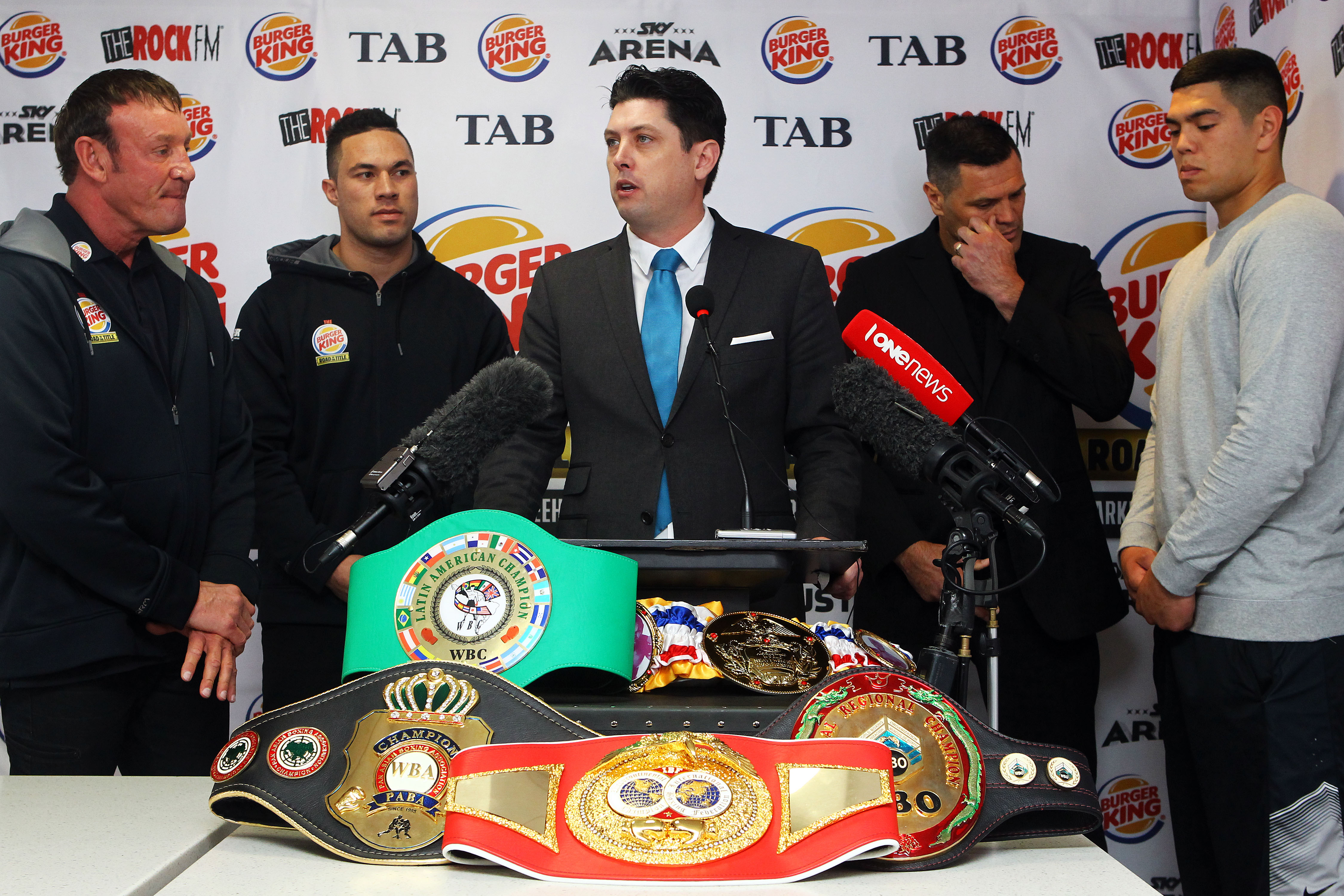
- Duco Event Press Conference for Joseph Parker vs Kali Meehan
- Industry: Boxing, Corporate Events and Sport
- Founded: 5 April 2004; 22 years ago in Auckland, New Zealand
- Founder: David Higgins; John McRae [2004-2010]
- Headquarters: Auckland CBD, Auckland, New Zealand
- Key people: Former Co owner Dean Lonergan; Current CEO Craig Cotton
- Website: www.ducoevents.com

Duco Events (also known as Duco Boxing or Duco) is an event promotions company led by the co-founder and current owner, New Zealand entrepreneur David Higgins. The company mostly promotes corporate events like celebrity dinners, charity balls and galas, as well as sporting events for rugby, cricket and most notably boxing. They have hosted major events including Brisbane Global Rugby Tens, NRL Auckland Nines, Joseph Parker vs. Andy Ruiz and David Tua vs Shane Cameron

== Business Relationships ==
Duco was founded by David Higgins and John McRae in 2004 and they promoted their first boxing event, David Tua vs. Shane Cameron, on 3 October 2009. McRae and his executive production company VADR sold their interest in Duco Events following the David Tua vs. Friday Ahunanya fight and acquired a stake in Sky Arena, a SKY TV pay-per-view company and also founded esports broadcaster and tournament platform www.letsplay.live in 2015. In 2014, Duco signed Martin Snedden to become their new CEO of the company. In 2016, Duco Events paired up with Bob Arum of Top Rank to co-promote Joseph Parker vs. Andy Ruiz Jr. and Parker vs Cojanu. After the Parker vs Ruiz Jr. world title fight, Snedden stepped down as CEO. After Parker vs Razvan Cojanu, Lonergan and Higgins decided to part ways. Lonergan went on to create D & L Events in Australia and is the main promoter for Jeff Horn. Higgins continues to run Duco Events in New Zealand and work with Joseph Parker. At the end of Parker's six year fight deal with Duco, he signed a three-fight deal with Eddie Hearn under Matchroom Sport, with Higgins taking a management role within team Parker.

== Boxing ==
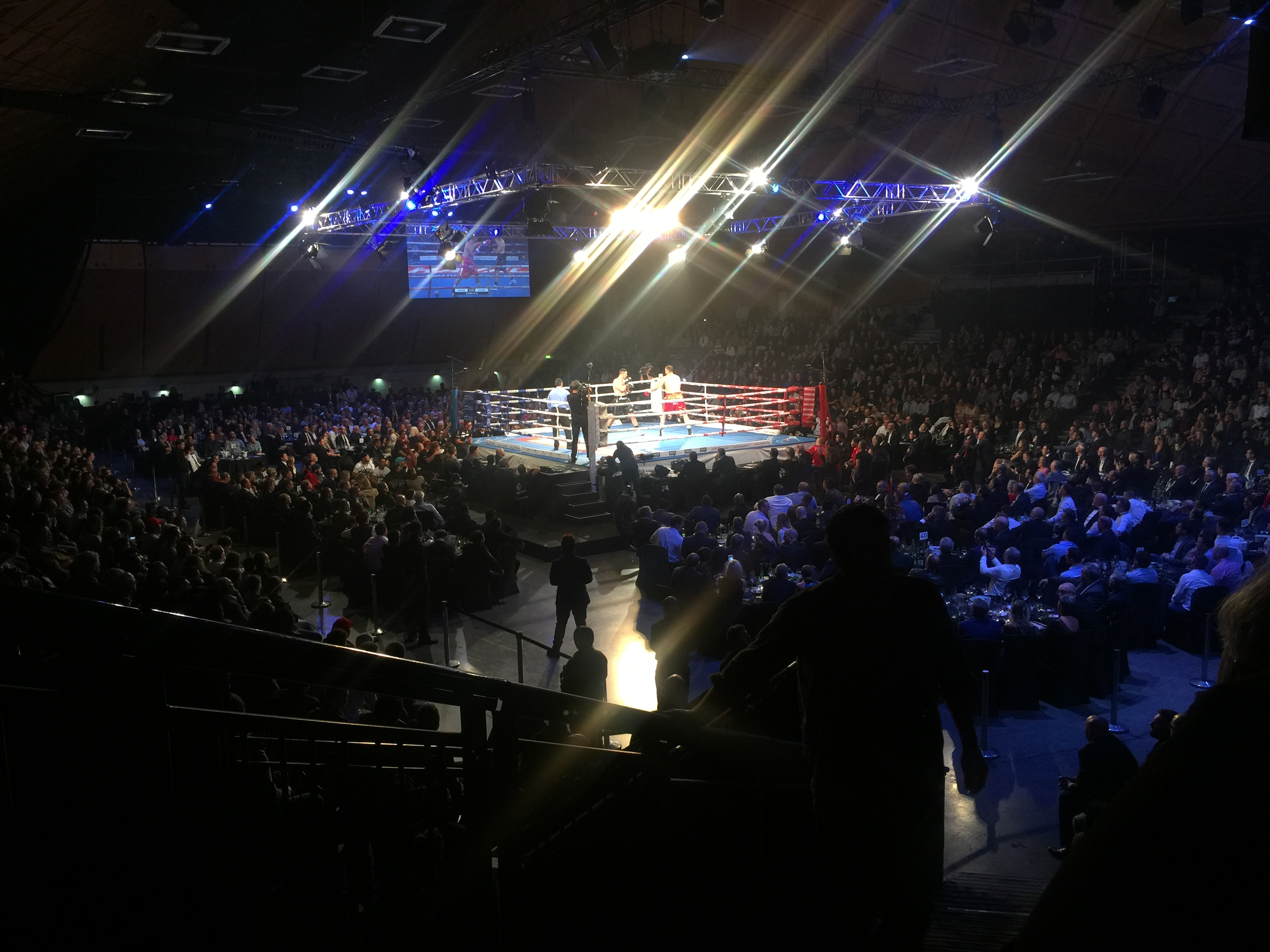
Joseph Parker competing at Vodafone Events Center in Auckland

In January 2009, Duco Events announced that David Tua will fight against Shane Cameron with this being the biggest boxing event in New Zealand history at the time. The fight was originally scheduled for June at Waikato Stadium, however due to Shane Cameron injuring his hand, it was postponed to October at Mystery Creek. The event was quite successful with Duco Events turning a profit. After making his Professional debut in 2012, Joseph Parker signed a six-year fight contract with Duco. Duco Events has promoted 20 boxing events, majority of them having Parker as the Main Event. In this time Parker won the New Zealand heavyweight title, six regional boxing titles, and World Heavyweight title. When the contract expired, David Higgins helped Parker sign with Eddie Hearn of Matchroom Boxing. In August 2013, Duco signed a six-year fight deal with Robert Berridge. While with Duco, Berridge has competed in four of their boxing events and won two regional titles. Slightly under a year and a half with Duco, the contract was terminated after an alcohol-fuelled incident by Robert Berridge at one of Ducos events. In 2014, Jeff Horn signed a multi-year deal with Duco. While under Duco, Horn fought seven times in New Zealand and won six Regional titles. After the split between Higgins and Lonergan, Horn stayed with Dean Lonergan in Australia under Duco Australia, later called D & L Events. In 2014, Izuagbe Ugonoh signed with Duco. While with Duco he fought on eight of Duco's boxing events and won three regional titles. In December 2016, Ugonoh decided to leave Duco in sign with a new Promoter. In 2014, Duco signed David Letele. Letele mostly used a wrestling like gimmick called the Brown Buttabean. In his time with Duco, he had 5 corporate fights, 20 professional fights and 1 exhibition. Most times fighting local corporate boxers. This was originally an experiment to help raise revenue and sell tickets. It effectively worked and also helped Letele lose over 90 kg. In 2016, Letele stopped fighting local fighters and started fighting legitimate professional boxers. Letele eventually retired after a loss to Manu Vatuvei in 2018.

== Other Sporting Events ==
In 2014, Duco events began an annual Rugby League sporting event called NRL Auckland Nines. The inaugural event was successful with over $9 million return. In 2017, the event ceased to continue due to lack of interest from the general public, which essentially made the event flop. There was an idea to move the event to Australia, however the event has not happened since. In 2017, Duco Events began another annual event, this time in Rugby called Brisbane Global Rugby Tens. At the inaugural event, only half capacity of tickets were sold. The 2018 event still went ahead but the event took a hiatus in 2019, but it is unknown if the event will return. In 2019, Duco hosted a Celebrity Twenty20 cricket event where Rugby Legends would take Cricket legends in a T20 Cricket match. The match took place on 25 January 2019, at the Hagley Oval. The event was considered a success will all 9,000 tickets sold out.

== Corporate Events ==
As well as sporting events, Duco have hosted a variety of celebrity dinners, charity dinners, galas and balls. Some of the celebrities include Bob Geldof, Mick Fleetwood, John Key, Richard Branson, Nigella Lawson, and many more. One of the celebrities that they have worked with, Gordon Ramsay, cancelled on a charity fundraiser that was hosted by Duco. David Higgins and John McRae took Ramsay and his agent to the New Zealand High court with a claim of $2.2 million, which was later settled after Ramsay flew to New Zealand for mediation which saw a 15-hour negotiation before a resolution was achieved.

== Boxers privously signed by Duco ==
Boxer	Estimated Date of Signed	Estimated Date of Departure	Number of fights Promoted by Duco	Titles won with Duco	Boxrec References
Joseph Parker	August 2012	June 2019	20	WBO World Heavyweight title WBC - EPBC Heavyweight title WBA Oceania Heavyweight title WBO Africa Heavyweight title WBC - OPBF Heavyweight title WBO Oriental Heavyweight title WBA - PABA Heavyweight title NZNBF Heavyweight title	
Jeff Horn	July 2014	August 2017	10	WBO World Welterweight Title WBO Inter-Continental Welterweight Title interim WBA Oceania Welterweight Title; WBA Pan African Welterweight Title; IBF Inter-Continental Welterweight Title; WBA - PABA Welterweight title	
David Letele	July 2014	December 2018	16	Duco Events Corporate World Heavyweight title King of the Coromandel Heavyweight title Duco Event's Corporate Intercontinental Heavyweight title Duco Event's Corporate USA Heavyweight title Duco Event's Corporate World Australia Heavyweight title	
Robert Berridge	October 2013	January 2015	4	WBO Oriental Light Heavyweight title WBA - PABA Light Heavyweight title	
Izuagbe Ugonoh	October 2014	December 2016	8	IBF Mediterranean Heavyweight title WBO Africa Heavyweight title Interim WBA Oceania Heavyweight title	

== Controversy ==
In 2013, Duco was heavily criticised for saving money by failing to provide qualified medical professionals at Fight for Life. This was referring to the 14 December 2013 event with the main event between Shane Cameron and Brian Minto. Manager Ken Reinsfeld said the person employed to stitch cuts "had no idea" and that "it's important the guy ringside is competent. I was shocked when I found out he wasn't registered. " Shane Cameron said that in 16 years of boxing, he had never fought without a registered doctor ringside. Charity fighters were also not medically assessed at the end of their bouts. Lonergan defended the apparent oversight saying "so be it" and while things were not perfect, "ultimately responsibility relies with me, no one else." This incident happened just a month after light heavyweight boxer Daniel MacKinnon suffered a brain bleed on another card and was rushed to hospital where his heart stopped for 40 seconds. Ulitimately MacKinnon recovered.
