= David Higgins (event promoter) =

New Zealand boxing manager

- Born: 13 December 1979 (age 46); Auckland, New Zealand
- Education: University of Auckland; Selwyn College
- Occupations: Boxing promoter Sports promoter Music promoter
- Years active: 2004–present
- Known for: Duco Events
- Website: www.ducoevents.com

David Higgins (born 13 December 1979) is a New Zealand boxing and sports promoter, boxing manager, music promoter, major events manager, and is the founder of Duco Events. Higgins has promoted significant events including David Tua vs Shane Cameron, Joseph Parker vs. Andy Ruiz, NRL Auckland Nines, Brisbane Global Rugby Tens, Synthony Festival, T20 Black Clash and the New Zealand Fight for Life series.

He has managed many notable boxers, including Joseph Parker, Jeff Horn, and David Nyika. Other New Zealand boxers he has promoted include David Letele, David Tua, Shane Cameron, Robert Berridge, Sam Rapira, and Junior Fa.

In recognition of his contributions to professional boxing and sports tourism in the Pacific, Higgins was bestowed the honorary Samoan high chief (matai) title Segiali'i in 2015.

== Early life ==
Higgins attended Selwyn College and graduated in 1998. He grew up in poverty and did not meet his father until later in life. After graduating he enrolled into University of Auckland in Bachelor of Commerce degree majoring in marketing and international business. He graduated from the University in 2002. Higgins got into events after finding a job on Student Job Search working with the Employers and Manufacturers Association, working in marketing for their events, which would lead into him running their events. Higgins quickly decided that he did not like corporate life and instead started his own event business in 2004, Duco Events.

== Events ==
=== Speaking events ===
Higgins started Duco Events, hosting charity dinner speaking events in Auckland. The first notable events was held in November 2008 at the SKYCITY Convention Centre with a Dinner with Bob Geldof. Between 2008 to 2019 Higgins went on to host many more significant figures including Co-founder of Fleetwood Mac Mick Fleetwood, former Prime Minister of New Zealand John Key, co founder of Virgin Group Richard Branson, English food writer and television cook Nigella Lawson,, former All Blacks head coach Graham Henry and many more. In 2024, Higgins began hosting more celebrity speaking events with the former Prime Minister of the United Kingdom Boris Johnson.

=== Sporting Events ===
In 2014, Higgins, with Duco Events, branched out from hosting boxing events to promoting other sporting events. Higgins began with NRL Auckland Nines. The inaugural event was successful with over $9 million return. However the event ceased in 2017. Higgins would host two Rugby events, similar to the NRL Nines, called the Brisbane Global Rugby Tens. The event would be hosted in 2017 and 2018. In 2019, Higgins began hosting annual celebrity cricket events called T20 Black Clash, with the main theme Cricket Legends vs Rugby Legends.

=== Synthony ===
In 2018, Higgins bought Synthony from the New Zealand creators of Synthony, David Elmsly and Erika Amoore. Synthony was originally inspired by an orchestra that did covers of songs at London’s Royal Albert Hall. From there he would trademark Synthony across the world. Synthony has gone from selling a thousands tickets at the town hall to over 35,000 ticket in the Auckland Domain with Synthony Festival. In 2019, Synthony had its first international event in Brisbane; from there, Synthony has sold out across the world. Synthony being adaptable in its music, has done multiple themes, including having a metal orchastra and Pride events for the rainbow community.

== Boxing ==
=== Fight of the Century and David Tua ===
On 31 January 2009, Higgins and John McRae, announced they would promote an event featuring David Tua and Shane Cameron. At the time, this was the biggest boxing event in New Zealand history, with boxers guaranteed to receive $500,000 each. The fight was originally scheduled for 6 June at Waikato Stadium, however due to Cameron injuring his hand during his warm up fight in March 2009, the fight was postponed. The event was postponed to 3 October, where it took place at Mystery Creek. David Tua won the bout and the event is considered a huge success with Higgins making a profit. The event was broadcast on Sky Pay per view. Following the event David Higgins announced that David Tua will take on Friday Ahunanya, the same guy that beat Shane Cameron. There was a struggle behind the scenes as David Tua was stuck in a three fight exclusive deal with Maori TV. Due to this Tua couldn't fight overseas and couldn't do PPV events making more revenue. David Tua won the bout the relationship between Higgins and Maori TV wasn't good. David Higgins didn't promote another event with David Tua until 2013 for Tuas final fight against Alexander Ustinov.

=== Joseph Parker Professional Debut, International title fights ===
In 2012, Joseph Parker made his Professional boxing debut against Dean Garmonsway on a Duco Events promoted boxing event, Shane Cameron vs Monte Barrett. After the event, Higgins signed a six-year management deal with parker. In 2013, Higgins promoted two boxing events with Joseph Parker as the main event. First event with Parker knocking out Frans Botha. After the win, Higgins offered Shane Cameron, for the New Zealand Title. However Cameron turned the fight down as he wanted guaranteed money instead of winner takes all. Instead, Parker took on Afa Tatupu for the NZNBF New Zealand heavyweight title. A few days before the fight, Higgins offered a million dollar fight to Sonny Bill Williams to fight the winner of Tatupu and Parker. Williams management team was not interests. Parker won the bout against Tatupu by TKO, however causing a cut, keeping Parker out of action till the following year. In 2014, Higgins promoted four boxing events with three in New Zealand and one in USA. First event with Brian Minto fighting Parker. At this time David Higgins started receiving criticism from Lance Revill for ending the career of Shane Cameron and pushing Parkers career too fast. Parker won against Minto by TKO. Minto made the excuse that he received a broken nose during training camp and wasn't emotional in the fight with his father on his death bed. Higgins continued promoting events with Parker fighting in USA against Keith Thompson in August, Sherman Williams in New Zealand in October and Irineu Beato Costa Junior in December. In 2015, Higgins signed a multi-year sponsorship deal with Burger King for Joseph Parker Road to Title quest. Higgins went on to promote five boxing events with Parker defeating Jason Pettaway, Yakup Saglam, Kali Meehan, Bowie Tupou, and Daniel Martz. At the Pettaway fight, Brian Minto complained that he was barred from attending the event against Parker. Minto was in New Zealand for his own fight he was competing in, in an eight-man cruiserweight fight. In August 2015, Kali Meehan agreed to fight Parker. This fight at the time was considered to be the next New Zealander vs New Zealander Mega boxing event similar to Tua vs Cameron. Not only did Parker won the fight, he ended the career of Kali Meehan and hold the record of most titles being competed for in a single boxing bout in New Zealand with six regional titles. In 2016, Higgins promoted five events with Parker, one in Samoa against Jason Bergman which is considered the biggest boxing event in Samoa history, mandatory world title challenge spot against Carlos Takam, Solomon Haumono, Alexander Dimitrenko and a World title fight against Andy Ruiz.

=== Joseph Parker World Title fights, Loss of title ===
In October 2019, Higgins was given the green light to promote the world title fight. After months of speculation if the fight will happen in New Zealand, it was announced that the fight would happen in Auckland in December 2016. Parker won the World title fight by majority decision, however after the fight Martin Snedden split from Higgins company, Duco. In May 2017, Higgins promoted an event for Parkers world title defence. The fight was originally to fight against Hughie Fury, however, due to a back injury, a last minute opponent had to be found on two weeks notice. Parker successfully defended his bout against Razvan Cojanu. However, after the event, Dean Lonergan and Higgins decided to split from working with each other. Parker went on to defend his World title against Hughie Fury in September 2017. A few days before the fight, a press conference took place promoting the World title fight. At the event, Higgins was ushered out of the room by security after he shouting accusations to the promoter Mick Hennessey. Higgins admitted he had a couple of drinks before the Press Conference. Parker successfully defended his world title against Fury. Throughout November 2017 to January 2018 Higgins confirmed that he was in negotiations with Eddie Hearn for an Anthony Joshua vs. Joseph Parker World title mega fight. The fight was confirmed in mid-January 2018. Parker lost the bout by unanimous decision.

=== Joseph Parker Comeback ===
In July 2018, Parker took on Dillian Whyte. Before the fight, David Higgins put a $40,000 bet for Parker to win the bout. The fight ended in controversy with Whyte won by Unanimous Decision, however, Parker was knocked down in the second round due to an accidental headbutt. Higgins planned to put in an appeal for the decision to be changed however decided not to put in the appeal. In December 2018, Higgins promoted his first boxing event in 19 months, and first time promoting the event on his own without Dean Lonergan and Martin Snedden. This was to give Parker a fight in New Zealand. Parker took on Alexander Flores and won by TKO. Higgins was looking to make little to no money at this event. In 2019, Higgins and Parkers six-year deal had expired. Before the deal expired, Higgins helped Parker look for the best deal for Parker with overseas promoters. In the end, Parker signed with Eddie Hearn, however, Higgins signed on to remain a part of Parker's management team, during Parkers three-fight deal.

== Personal life ==
Higgins is married to Aria, and they have two children together.
