= Joseph Parker =

New Zealand boxer (born 1992)

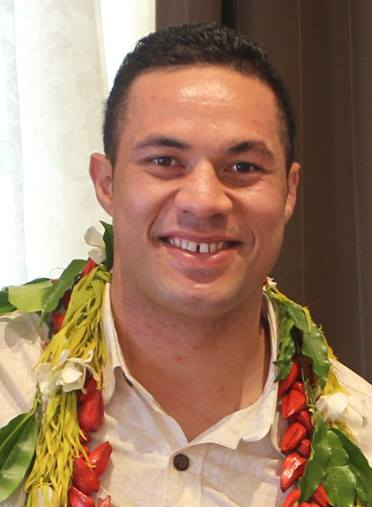
- Parker in Samoa, December 2016

Personal information
- Nationality: New Zealand, Samoan
- Born: Joseph Dennis Parker; 9 January 1992 (age 34) Auckland, New Zealand
- Height: 6 ft 4 in (193 cm)
- Weight: Heavyweight

Boxing career
- Reach: 76 in (193 cm)
- Stance: Orthodox

Boxing record
- Total fights: 40
- Wins: 36
- Win by KO: 24
- Losses: 4
Medal record
Men's amateur boxing
Representing New Zealand
Arafura Games
Gold medal – first place	2011 Darwin	Super-heavyweight
China Open
Gold medal – first place	2011 Guiyang	Super-heavyweight
Belgrade Winner Tournament
Gold medal – first place	2012 Belgrade	Super-heavyweight
Youth Summer Olympics
Silver medal – second place	2010 Singapore	Super-heavyweight
Youth World Championships
Bronze medal – third place	2010 Baku	Super-heavyweight

Joseph Dennis Parker, OM (born 9 January 1992) is a New Zealand professional boxer. He held the World Boxing Organization (WBO) heavyweight title from 2016 to 2018. At regional level, he has held multiple heavyweight championships, including the WBO Oriental, Africa, and Oceania titles; as well as the PABA, OPBF, and New Zealand titles. As an amateur, he represented New Zealand at the 2010 Commonwealth Games in the super-heavyweight division, and narrowly missed qualification for the 2012 Summer Olympics.

Parker turned professional in July 2012 with Duco Events in Auckland, under the tutelage of Sir Bob Jones. After defeating Andy Ruiz for the vacant WBO title, Parker became the first heavyweight boxer from either New Zealand or the Pacific Islands to win a major world championship.

== Early life ==
Joseph Parker was born in South Auckland on 9 January 1992, to Dempsey and Sala Parker. He is of Samoan descent, with his ancestral roots going back to the Faleula Village on the main island of Upolu where his mother hails from. Both of his parents migrated to New Zealand from Samoa in the early 1980s. His father Dempsey was named after world heavyweight champion American boxer Jack Dempsey. Parker grew up in the large suburb of Māngere in Auckland, and attended Marcellin College in the suburb of Hillsborough. At the age of three, he enjoyed jabbing into his father's palms and while he was still a young boy Dempsey gave him boxing gloves and a punching bag. When he was ten years old, he joined the Papatoetoe Boxing Club to pursue and learn more about the sport. He was trained by Grant Arkell and former boxer Manny Santos.

When Parker was growing up, he admired David Tua and Maselino Masoe who were from the same area as him. Parker is the middle child; he has one older sister, Elizabeth, and a younger brother, John, who is currently a professional boxer. Parker also comes from a religious family, belonging to the Church of Jesus Christ of Latter-day Saints.

== Amateur career ==
Parker had success during his 66-fight amateur career, becoming a two-time New Zealand amateur heavyweight champion in 2010 and 2011, as well as winning several amateur tournaments and scoring some notable wins on the international circuit. Having his first fight at the early age of twelve, Parker grew and progressed, winning the 2009 New Zealand Golden Gloves Tournament in Palmerston North. He followed up with a second placing at the New Zealand Elite National Championships, losing to rival Junior Fa.

Parker started boxing internationally at sixteen years of age. His first international tournament was at the Commonwealth Boxing Championships in 2010 where he won silver. Parker's first major event was the AIBA Youth World Championships in Azerbaijan. He was looked after by the Australian National Team Management as his coach Grant Arkell could not afford to accompany him. He was the sole representative of his country in the quarterfinals after he beat Turkey's Yusuf Açik to face the Pan-American champion Yuniel Castro Chavez from Cuba. Parker won the bout on points, 8:1 to advance to the semifinals. There he fought Croatia's Filip Hrgović. They traded punches in a closely matched bout that saw the scores remain within one point of each other for most of the match. In the end it was the Croatian who managed to gain the upper hand in the final round and push ahead to an 8:6 victory. Despite leaving the ring nursing a nose injury, Parker won bronze. Parker then travelled to Singapore, to compete at the Youth Olympics. He won silver after defeating Jozsef Zsigmond in the semifinals. He then proceeded to the final where he lost on points against Tony Yoka of France.

After what was a busy season for Parker, he finished the year featuring in the 2010 Commonwealth Games in New Delhi. The then 18-year-old beat Canadian Didier Bence 14:7 in a fiery contest, charging home late in the third and final round when it appeared the fight was slipping away. Parker was down 7:5 on points when he landed a decisive right hand to Bence's head with one minute 15 seconds remaining. It knocked the Canadian down and effectively ended the fight as Parker registered the last nine points. Parker then advanced to the quarterfinals, losing to Tariq Abdul Haqq. The fight was tied at 7:7 after Parker landed a late punch to tie up the scores. The judges, however, gave Abdul Haqq the win by a majority decision of three of the five judges, meaning that Parker missed earning a medal.

In 2011, Parker won his first notable gold medal in Darwin, Australia, at the Arafura Games. He began with two wins by stoppage, with a first round victory in the quarterfinals over Jean Tuisamoa of New Caledonia. After winning the semifinals against Jake Ageidu, he met Emile Gineste from Tahiti in the Final. Parker had little trouble with his opponent, with the referee ending the contest in the first round. Parker continued his rise up the World Amateur standings, with further gold medal success. He opened his Chinese campaign in Guiyang at the China Open tournament, stopping Iderbat Davaalkhagva from Mongolia. In the final he was opposed by Ospanov Doszham from Kazakhstan. Parker was awarded the victory by way of a six-point winning margin. At the 50th Belgrade annual boxing tournament, Parker ended his amateur career defeating 2012 London Olympics berth winner, Johan Linde of Australia, to claim his third gold. He had previously beaten Erik Pfeifer of Germany on points to secure a place in the finals.

== Professional career ==
=== Early career ===
Parker made his professional debut SkyCity Auckland. Dean Garmonsway was chosen as Parker's first opponent. A Hamilton physical education school teacher and former Waikato Rugby league representative, Garmonsway had only three professional boxing bouts, amounting to two wins and one loss. The bout featured on the undercard of Godfather of All Fight Nights, Shane Cameron vs. Monte Barrett title eliminator. At the time, Parker was considered New Zealand's most promising boxer since David Tua. Parker defeated Garmonsway by technical knockout midway through the second round.

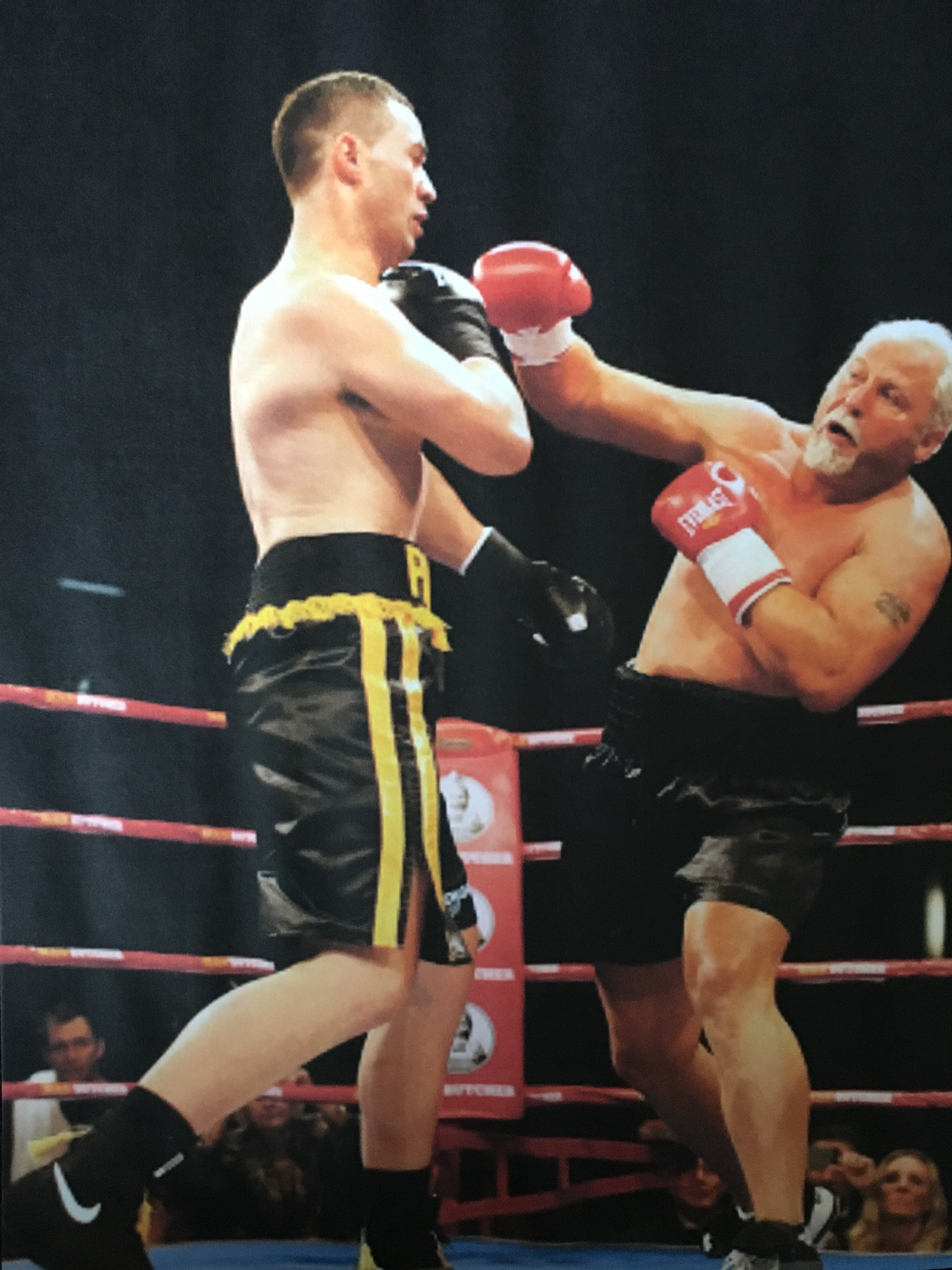
Parker (left) vs. Botha, 2013

After scoring a number of consecutive victories in New Zealand and the US, Parker agreed to fight Francois Botha. Botha was known to be capable of landing a quality punch or two and had the ability to send fighters to the canvas, though Parker was considered the favourite to win. He defeated Botha in June 2013 by a second-round knockout over the former four-time world heavyweight contender.

Following his win over Botha, Parker extended his unbeaten professional record to seven wins on 10 October 2013 with a second-round knockout over Afa Tatupu at the Trusts Arena in Henderson, West Auckland. Parker secured the New Zealand National Boxing Federation title with a win marred only by a serious cut he suffered in the opening round when the fighters clashed heads. His charge responded with a flurry of punches which lowered former champion Tatupu two minutes into the second round. The pair went toe-to-toe for much of the second round before Parker's superior speed and power made the difference.

Parker started off 2014 after he defeated Marcelo Nascimento after a flurry of blows in the seventh round saw referee Brad Vocale stop the fight, although Nascimento protested the decision. Parker was the dominant figure throughout the bout and won the Pan Asian Boxing Association interim heavyweight title for his efforts. The fight, on the undercard of Wladimir Klitschko's world heavyweight title defence against Australian Alex Leapai, was Parker's eighth as a professional. Nascimento was a late replacement for durable veteran Sherman Williams.

In his next bout he defeated 39-year-old defending WBO Oriental heavyweight champion Brian Minto via seventh-round stoppage on 5 July 2014 in Auckland.

Following an easy victory over Keith Thompson in August, Parker went on to outclass 42-year-old Sherman Williams with a convincing unanimous decision. After losing, Williams continued to cause controversy after repeatedly attempting to grab the microphone within the ring and issuing a re-match challenge to Parker. He claimed that he would knock out Parker in the sixth round in a re-match. Parker was quoted saying that it was not up to him, and that they are fighters and to leave it to the judges to decide.

Parker continued his winning form after he knocked out WBO Latino heavyweight champion Irineu Beato Costa Junior in December 2014, before doing the same to Jason Pettaway in March 2015. Parker had moved to 13–0 after beating Pettaway and Costa Junior, with both victories coming from knockouts in the fourth round. Joseph retained his Pan Asian Boxing Association and WBO Oriental heavyweight titles.

Following a three-week camp as sparring partner to Wladimir Klitschko in Florida, Parker announced to fight three more bouts in 2015, re-commencing in Palmerston North on 13 June where he defeated Yakup Saglam via second-round knockout. He maintained his unbeaten record, notching his fourteenth win and twelfth by knockout while retaining his two titles.

Following the withdrawal of Japanese heavyweight champion Kyotaro Fujimoto, Parker beat replacement Bowie Tupou on 1 August in Invercargill, New Zealand, by first-round knockout. He then fought 45-year-old former world title contender Kali Meehan (42–5) on 15 October in Auckland. The New Zealand-born Australian Meehan earned his shot at the promising heavyweight after winning the Super 8 competition and beating New Zealand veteran Shane Cameron. Parker controlled the opening two rounds, en route to a third round stoppage victory, adding the WBC's Eurasia Pacific Boxing Council and WBA Oceania titles to his collection.

Parker's next two opponents were both named on 9 November 2015, with 24-year-old Daniel Martz selected for 5 December 2015 in Hamilton, followed by southpaw Jason Bergman on 23 January 2016 in Apia, Samoa.

Parker scored a first-round technical knockout win over Martz.

Parker notched his 18th consecutive win with an eighth-round technical knockout of Jason Bergman in Samoa. Far from the one or two round finishes of his more recent fights, Parker was made to work for his victory by a staunch and determined Bergman. The challenger offered very little on offense but displayed some impressive mettle in soldiering through a number of Parker onslaughts, the champion tenderising the body relentlessly in what proved to be the ideal workout against his first southpaw opponent. After twice sending Bergman to his knee in earlier rounds for the count, one particularly brutal liver shot crumbled the American, the referee had seen enough as he waved off the fight.

=== Rise up the ranks ===
It was confirmed that Parker and Carlos Takam would fight on 21 May 2016 in an IBF heavyweight eliminator. The winner would be required to fight for the world title against the reigning champion, Anthony Joshua of Britain. Prior to the fight being announced, Parker and his handlers twice avoided fighting Takam the previous year because of the risk involved. The fight took place with Parker winning a unanimous decision after twelve rounds, in front of a vocal home crowd at South Auckland's Vodafone Events Centre in New Zealand. Two judges scored it 116–112, and one at 115–113. Takam was largely outworked by Parker, and neither threw many punches to secure the rounds.

The fight contract for Joseph Parker vs. Solomon Haumono was finally signed off on 23 May 2016. This match-up was a long time in the making, with the pair having shown interest in fighting each other in the past. Haumono's WBA Oceania and PABA heavyweight titles were initially on the line. It was hyped as a Trans-Tasman grudge match with Parker's IBF world heavyweight mandatory position on the line which attracted the attention of the Australian media and public. Parker defeated Haunono via fourth-round technical knockout.

Parker's team made the announcement of Parker's 1 October fight in late July with the tall Ukrainian-born German Alexander Dimitrenko in a 12-round bout at the Vodafone Events Centre in Manukau, the same venue Parker secured a points win over Carlos Takam to secure the IBF number one mandatory position in May. Trainer Kevin Barry commented that the Dimitrenko bout was a preparation for his eventual heavyweight title fight with Anthony Joshua. Parker started off strong knocking down Dimitrenko in round one. He then used his speed in round two and knocked Dimitrenko down twice following right hands. Dimitrenko was knocked down a final time in round three; as he was falling, Parker hit another body shot, which the referee appeared to miss. The fight was called off 1 minute and 36 seconds into round three.

=== WBO heavyweight champion ===
==== Parker vs. Ruiz ====
In late October, the Parker versus Andy Ruiz title fight had been officially sanctioned by the WBO. The organisation had granted permission to Parker fighting Andy Ruiz for their belt with their championship committee voting unanimously in favor of the title fight. The belt was vacated by Tyson Fury, who was battling depression and drug issues and had not fought since November 2015 after defeating Wladimir Klitschko for the WBA, IBF, and WBO titles. Although the WBO president Francisco Varcarcel said his preference was to set up a four-man box-off for the vacant title involving the four leading available contenders for their belt but it had gone down the route of their own rules book which gave number one ranked Parker the first rights to challenge. With number two ranked Klitschko targeting the WBA belt it cleared the way for number three Ruiz to step up against Parker.

Discussions and negotiations began after Fury was expected to be stripped of his WBO belt over inactivity and testing positive for cocaine. With his sudden announcement that he would relinquish his various heavyweight world title belts due to his issues with various problems, it was unclear exactly how the WBO and WBA would go about filling the vacancies. But before Fury vacated, Duco Events promoter Dean Lonergan announced in early October he had been negotiating an alternative WBO title fight against Andy Ruiz, suggesting he had a chance of reaching a deal with Bob Arum. He pointed out that WBO rules stated that the two best-classified contenders will challenge for the title. Arum told ESPN.com that he was in talks with the WBO about making it for the vacant title. He also said his experience dealing with Parker and his team has so far been a pleasure.

Parker became the first heavyweight boxer from New Zealand to win a world title as he won via majority decision. Two of the judges scored it 115–113 in favour of Parker as the third judge scored it a 114–114 draw. Parker said it was a dream come true. Ruiz started off the better boxer and was the main aggressor throughout the fight. Parker picked up the pace in the middle rounds winning most of them but Ruiz got back into the fight during the championship rounds. Both boxers showed great respect for each other throughout the bout. Ruiz spoke of his unhappiness stating he felt he won the fight or even deserved a draw and wanted a rematch. Parker was in favour of a rematch in the future; however, on 29 December David Higgins from Duco ruled it out.

==== Parker vs. Cojanu ====
In December 2016, David Haye was made mandatory challenger for Parker's world title, however, he chose to fight cruiserweight Tony Bellew in a heavyweight grudge match on pay-per-view. This pushed Hughie Fury to become next in line for a title shot. As speculation grew, confirmation of the Parker versus Fury fight became closer after promoter Frank Warren indicated he would be announcing details of a fight in the coming week. After a deal did not take place between both fighters' promoters, the WBO ordered a purse bid to take place at their offices in Puerto Rico the following week, with the winning bidder winning rights to choose the venue and date. Parker's promoters at Duco Events won the purse bid with a winning bid of US$3,000,011, announcing the date settled for 1 April in Auckland, New Zealand.

Several issues occurred prior to the fight being announced. The date of the then proposed fight between Parker and Fury came up for discussion and was pushed forward to 6 May after Fury and team appeared reluctant to travel to New Zealand for the fight scheduled for April. It saw WBO President Francisco Varcarcel take to social media to give Fury until 25 February to finalise the bout, otherwise, he would lose his position to challenge Parker for the world championship. Higgins, from Duco Events, then confirmed the bout would take place at the Spark Arena in New Zealand on 6 May. The location was due to Parker enjoying fighting in front of his Kiwi fans. Months up to the fight, Fury's father and trainer Peter Fury was denied a VISA entry into New Zealand. This was due to his criminal past, dating back to around 1990 when he was incarcerated for 10 years for drug-related offenses. Two days later, Peter was granted a special VISA from 28 March to 10 May. But it was eventually called off after Fury pulled out claiming an injury less than two weeks out from the event. Varcarcel stated the fight was now off and the problem laid within the Fury camp. After announcing the claim it gave Parker the rights to fight whoever he wanted when we wanted as a voluntary defense out of the top 15. Răzvan Cojanu was released as Parker's replacement for the Hughie Fury bout.

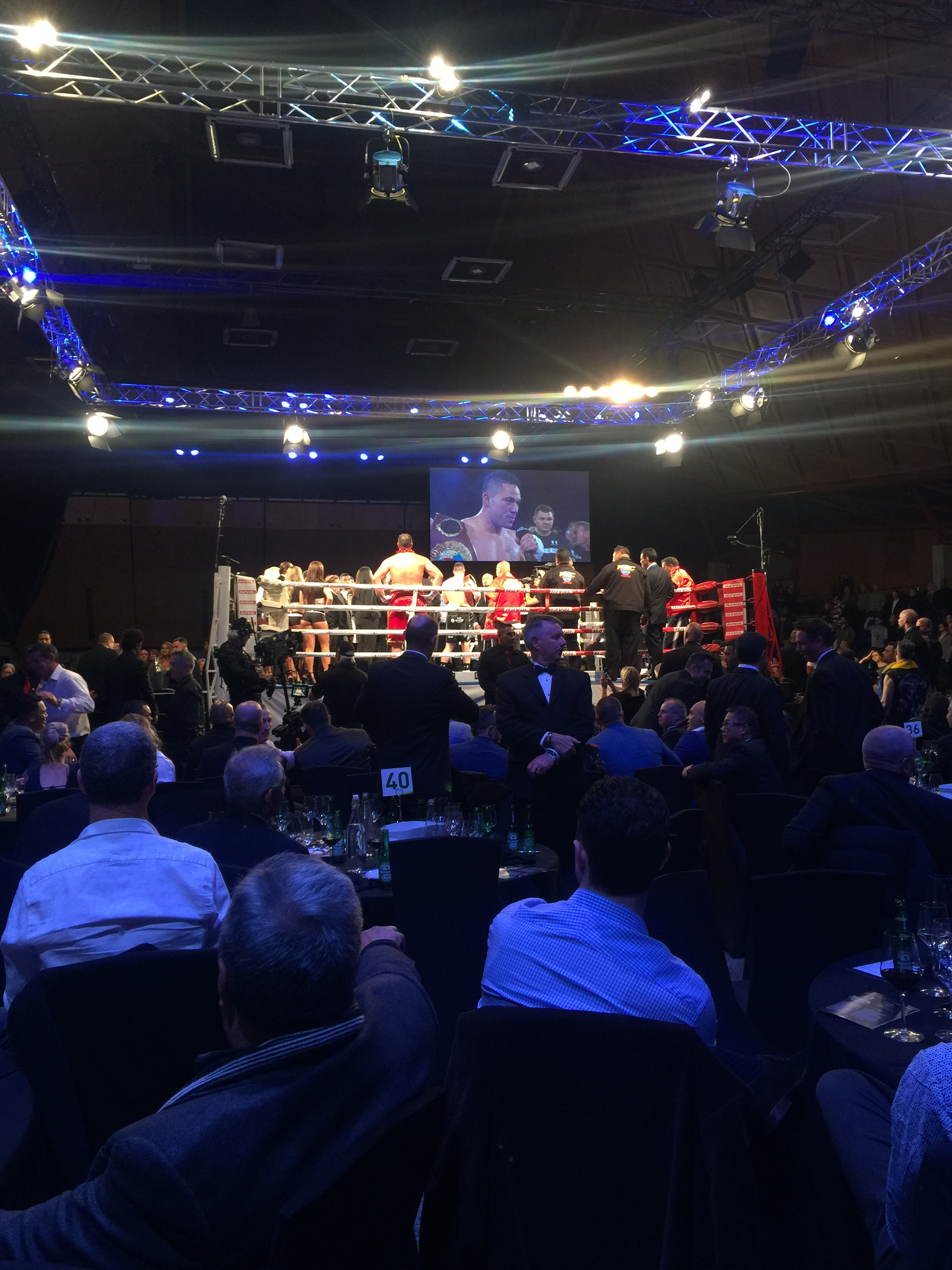
Parker after his first world title defence against Cojanu, 2017

Duco Events had been told by the WBO that they could pick a voluntary defence from within the organisation's top 15-ranked fighters after the controversial withdrawal of Hughie Fury. Dominic Breazeale, the American, ranked 6th with the WBO, announced on social media his interests in fighting Parker on late notice. Speculation also grew that number 14 ranked, Răzvan Cojanu of Romania would be Parker's replacement. Cojanu was involved in his training camp in Las Vegas towards the fight. WBC champion Deontay Wilder also called out Parker for a unification bout while Fury's cousin Tyson, the troubled former champion, said he'd be willing to jump in the ring. The following day it was confirmed Cojanu would replace Fury to challenge Parker for the WBO heavyweight belt. It was reported also that the fight would be shifted from Spark Arena, to the Vodafone Events Centre in Manukau.

Parker was determined to make a statement but couldn't manage that as he left his New Zealand campaign in a convincing unanimous decision. Parker out-pointed Cojanu in the first defence of his world heavyweight title. The judges scored it 119–108, 117–110, and 117–110 in a fight where Cojanu taunted him repeatedly. Parker later admitted he had problems connecting against Cojanu. But Parker's ability to keep disciplined in a fight that involved trash talk, flying elbows, clinches and head holds got him the win comfortably. After the fight, Parker said, "You can all see why we bring Răzvan into camp, we look for the best." This was said as praise, as Cojanu previously worked with Parker as a sparring partner.

After his first defense, Parker received huge criticism over his performance which saw many fighters claim they would knock Parker out, two of whom were British boxers, Tony Bellew and Dillian Whyte. Whyte said he was not impressed with Parker's performance and wanted to go head-to-head with him later in the year. Bellew, lashed out at Parker on social media, saying he could end Parker's reign as champion very quickly. Whilst Whyte hit back at Bellew's comments, saying he must wait in line.

==== Parker vs. Fury ====
Hughie Fury still maintained his mandatory challenger position, therefore a date was organised for the fight to be rescheduled for 23 September in Manchester, England. A contract was signed by both parties and would take place at Manchester Arena. With five days out from the fight, The British Boxing Board of Control had appointed British referee Terry O'Connor, the same official in charge of Fury's last two bouts. It saw Peter Fury exchanging a foul-mouthed argument with David Higgins at the final press conference in London. It started off with Higgins approaching Fury, unhappy with the appointment of British referee O'Connor for the fight. Higgins was then ejected from the press conference by security officials. Overall, Higgins' outburst caused a referee change after it began to create noise and headlines. As of 21 September, only 5,000 tickets had been sold since the start of the week. Hennessy was hoping to have a crowd of at least 8,000 at the arena, which has a capacity of 21,000.

Parker retained his world title on fight night. The fight went the 12 round distance, with two judges scoring the fight 118–110 in favour of Parker and the third judge had it 114–114, giving Parker the win via majority decision. Parker showed Fury respect throughout the fight, having to get through Fury's jab in order to land anything. The opening six rounds saw Fury flicking his jab into thin air, which caused Parker to think twice before going on the attack. Parker started finding his shots in the latter half. Parker finished strong in the last two rounds as Fury started showing signs of fatigue. In the post-fight, Parker said, "I felt the aggression was good on my side. He was really awkward and his movement was good, but I caught him with the harder punches I felt." Fury was paid £750,000 while Parker took home £1.1 million.

Promoter Mick Hennessy, as with the rest of the Fury camp, was disgusted with the wide scorecards, "This is corruption at its highest level in boxing. I thought it was an absolute masterclass, shades of Ali. Parker wasn't even in the fight. One of the worst decisions I've ever seen." He said he would be appealing the decision. WBO vice-president John Duggan backed the decision to have Parker as the winner. He made it clear that the result would not be investigated or overturned.

Surpassing his second defence and mandatory against Fury, Parker and his management team looked at taking him over to Japan. After a post-fight interview, Higgins suggested he was looking at Japan after making a comment that there had never been a Japanese heavyweight world champion. The most likely opponent being ranked Kyotaro Fujimoto, leaving Parker to have rights for a voluntary defence.

==== Parker vs. Joshua ====
On 7 November, it was reported that Australian boxer Lucas Browne had signed a deal to challenge Parker for his WBO title. Locations discussed were Parker's home city of Auckland or Melbourne in Australia. Browne's promoter Matt Clark stated that Browne had signed the contract and was now waiting on Parker to sign the deal. At the time, Browne was not listed in the WBO's top 15 rankings, meaning he would need to fight for a WBO regional title to get ranked. It was later reported that Parker's team were looking at Browne as a potential match-up if they failed to land a unification fight with WBA, IBF and IBO heavyweight champion Anthony Joshua (20–0, 20 KOs). According to Higgins, a date in March was being discussed with Joshua's team, however Eddie Hearn, promoter of Joshua, offered an 80–20 split, which would favor Joshua. Higgins spoke to Fairfax Media, saying the offer would need to be more reasonable, also taking into consideration the fight would take place in the UK.

Other names discussed for a Summer 2018 fight included Bryant Jennings and Alexander Povetkin. According to a Tweet from Parker on 15 November, he was offered less than half of what was paid to Charles Martin when he defended his IBF title against Joshua. The next day, Higgins told Fairfax Media that he and Hearn were still talking around a deal that would benefit all parties. Parker stated he was willing to drop to 35% of the net profit. Higgins made a final offer to Eddie Hearn on 22 November. He told Sky Sports, "It's our final bottom line decision. We feel anything less is disrespectful or a disgrace."

On 29 November, Hearn stated the fight could be confirmed within two weeks. Higgins listed Camp Nou as the potential venue. According to Hearn on 11 December, a deal was very close to being announced with the Principality Stadium in Cardiff a frontrunner to host the fight. Hearn jokingly said they were over-paying Parker, with the deal being 65–35. On 28 December, Higgins announced that a split had been agreed which would see Parker earn between 30 and 35% of the purse and the fight should take place in April 2018. Higgins stated that a rematch clause would be in place for Joshua, should he lose. In a potential rematch, Parker would get a 55% split. On 8 January 2018 Principality Stadium was confirmed as the venue for the fight. On 14 January, negotiations came to a close and the fight was officially announced to take place on 31 March in Cardiff, live on Sky Sports Box Office. In an official press release on 5 February, Showtime announced they would televise the fight live in the United States. Joshua and Parker both came in lighter compared to their respective previous bouts. Parker weighed in first at 236.7 pounds, his lightest since he beat Solomon Haumono in July 2016. Joshua weighed 242.2 pounds, his lightest since 2014 when he fought Michael Sprott. It was reported that Joshua would earn a career-high £18 million and Parker would also earn a career-high pay of £8 million.

Joshua was forced to go the distance to defeat Parker via a 12-round unanimous decision to claim the WBO title as well as retain his WBA, IBF, and IBO belts. The judges scored the fight 118–110, 118–110, and 119–109 in favour of Joshua. Many media outlets including ESPN had the fight around 116–112 with Joshua the clear winner. With going the distance, Joshua's 20 fight knockout streak came to an end. Parker used his movement well to slip a lot of Joshua's attack but in doing so did not do enough himself to win more rounds. Parker started on the backfoot in the opening rounds allowing Joshua to take the rounds. There was an accidental clash of heads in round 3, however, neither boxer was cut from this. There was another accidental head-butt in round 9 where the referee called for a short break. Joshua's tape on his left glove kept coming loose and he was ordered to go back to his corner for a re-tape. Parker suffered a cut over his left eye after Joshua accidentally elbowed him. In round 12, neither boxers engaged as much as expected with Joshua trying to track Parker down, who again, on the backfoot looked to survive the round. The fight was marred by Italian referee Giuseppe Quartarone, who kept both boxers from fighting on the inside. This mostly had a negative impact on Parker, where he was seen to have the most success. The referee was breaking the action each time both boxers were on the inside, even when they were still throwing shots. Many boxers, pundits and both the Sky Sports and Showtime broadcast team criticised the referee during and after the fight.

After the fight, Joshua explained his game plan for the fight, "My strategy in there was kind of stick behind the jab. It's one of the most important weapons. The old saying is the right hand could take you around the block, but a good jab will take you around the world. And that secured another championship belt. So I stuck behind the jab and I made sure anything that was coming back, I was switched on, I was focused and 12 rounds, baby! I thought it was hard, right?" Parker was humble in defeat and stated he would back stronger, "Today I got beaten by a better champion, bigger man. A lot to work on. It was a good experience being here. Thank you all for the opportunity to fight in this big stadium. We're gonna go back, train hard, plan again and come back stronger. No regrets, you know, take it on the chin. … So we'll be back again." When asked what he would do different, Parker replied, "Work harder. Come back stronger, more punches. But I would love to have another go. Just back to the drawing board." During the post fight press conference, Parker's team stated the referee did not speak English, whereas Joshua and his promoter Hearn disagreed and said he spoke English fluently. Compubox Punch stats showed that Joshua landed 139 of 383 punches thrown (36.3%) and Parker landed 101 of his 492 thrown (20.5%).

The fight was shown live in the USA on Showtime in the afternoon. The live showing averaged 346,000 viewers and peaked at 379,000 viewers. A replay was shown later in the evening which saw an increase. The replay averaged 430,000 viewers and peaked at 483,000 viewers. Nielsen Media Research, who released the figures do not have the facility to measure whether the same customers that watched the live showing tuned in for the replay.

=== Post-title fights ===
==== Parker vs. Whyte ====
According to Stuff on 10 May 2018, Parker's team were looking at a potential clash against heavyweight contender Alexander Ustinov (34–2, 25 KOs), with the fight having a possible revenge factor added to it. The reason behind this being Ustinov defeating and retiring David Tua in New Zealand in 2013. Promoter David Higgins believed the fight would be a big sell. A few weeks later, co-promoter Bob Arum was negotiating a deal for Parker to fight in Atlantic City, New Jersey on 18 August against Top Rank promoted Bryant Jennings (23–2, 13 KOs). On 5 June, The Ring Magazine stated there was an agreement in principle for the fight to take place. A day later, Higgins denied the reports that the fight was agreed and said although negotiations were still ongoing with Jennings team, there was still a chance Parker could still fight Ustinov in New Zealand. On the morning of 7 June, it was confirmed that Parker would instead return to the UK for a third-straight fight on 28 July at The O2 Arena in London against Dillian Whyte (23–1, 17 KOs) on Sky Box Office. An official press conference followed a few hours later. Whyte was originally being lined up to fight either Kubrat Pulev in an IBF eliminator or Luis Ortiz in a WBC eliminator. Many fans took to social media stating their frustration around the fight being on pay-per-view. Whyte along with Dave Higgins explained their reasons as to why the fight deserved to be on the PPV platform. Three days before the fight, it was confirmed a sell-out. It was revealed that before PPV revenue, both boxers would earn just over £1 million for the fight, with Whyte receiving slightly more, being the home fighter. Despite stating he would weigh less, Whyte came in at 258 1/2 pounds, 4 pounds heavier than his previous bout. Parker weighed 242 pounds, 16 pounds lighter than Whyte, however 6 pounds heavier than what he weighed in his loss to Joshua.

Whyte won the bout via unanimous decision in a fight which saw both boxers hit the canvas. Whyte knocked Parker down twice in the fight in dropping him in rounds 2 and 9. It looked as though a short left hook dropped Parker for the first time in his career, however, the instant replay showed it was a clash of heads leaving Parker concussed with no time to recover. Referee Ian John Lewis made the count. Most of the middle rounds were mostly back and forth action with both fighters having success. Whyte was coming forward, countering and began using his jab more and Parker was mostly on the back foot, using movement and landing 2-3 punch combinations. After round 6, Whyte began to show fatigue. This did not prevent him from carrying on going forward trying to land big shots as Parker was wary of Whyte's power. Whyte also starting using roughhouse tactics after the first few rounds. This included rabbit punches, head-butting, holding and hitting and pushing Parker over the ropes. He was warned once earlier in the fight and then warned again in the championship rounds, however, no points were deducted. Parker took over in the championship rounds but was unable to put Whyte away. Parker had an explosive start to round 12, knowing he needed a knockout to win, eventually knocked down a fatigued Whyte with 20 seconds left in the fight with a right hand to the head. Whyte got to his feet and survived the remaining seconds of the fight. The three judges scored the fight unanimously 113–112, 115–110, and 114–111 in favour of Whyte. Many of the pundits ringside, which included Steve Bunce had the fight closer including those on radio, with some even having Parker as the winner. Some portion of the boxing media also scored the fight close, in favour of Parker. The Sky Sports team, which included Matthew Macklin, David Haye, Johnny Nelson and Tony Bellew, were criticized for their views. If the first knock down was ruled as a clash of heads, the decision would have been a split draw, officially making the judges scores 112–114, 114–112 and 113–113.

Standing together, speaking to Sky Sports after the fight, Whyte gave Parker credit, "He was slick and I knew he was going to fight for the first few rounds, then come back in the final few rounds. I am annoyed I slipped at the final hurdle in the last round. I was rocked and took a few." Whyte stated he would take another fight before the end of 2018 and ready for Anthony Joshua in April 2019, "I would like to fight Joshua again if he wants it. I've still got a lot to learn so I would like to get one more in before him again." Parker had no complaints and humble in defeat, "I gave it my best; the better man and I will come back stronger." Parker's trainer Kevin Barry was very vocal after the fight regarding Whyte's rough tactics, claiming he should have had points taken off.

On 3 August, it was reported that Duco Events would appeal for the decision to be investigated. The reason for this was because Parker's team believed the head clash in round 2 which dropped Parker to the canvas affected the scorecards as well as Parker's performance during the middle rounds. It is believed that Parker was having success in round 2 before the head clash, therefore had the knockdown not occurred, the round would have been scored 10–9 in favour of Parker instead 10–8 for Whyte. In a statement, Higgins said, "It's clear that the clash of heads in the second round had a significant impact on the fight. In terms of the scorecards and Joseph's performance in the middle rounds (the headbutt made a big difference). In light of what is clear evidence of a significant error by the officials, there is a legitimate question as to whether the result should stand. That's a question Duco will be asking the sanctioning bodies on Joseph's behalf." Looking at the alternative scorecard having round 2 in favour of Parker would have resulted in the bout being scored a split decision draw. Higgins later revealed they would appeal but instead work towards a rematch with Whyte in the future. Parker stated he would continue fighting for another five years.

==== Parker vs. Flores ====
On 3 October 2018, Sky Sports confirmed that Parker would return to New Zealand for his next bout in December, with the fight taking place in Christchurch. The fight would be Parker's first in his home country in over 18 months. Parker's opponent was later announced to be American boxer Alexander Flores (17–1–1, 15 KOs), whose sole loss was to former IBF world champion Charles Martin in 2014. Speaking of the fight, Parker said, "For me, boxing is all about the challenge - and this is another big one. I know what is at stake. I need to win and win well. I need to knock him out and I will knock him out. But I can't focus on that, I need to focus on getting better, each and every time I get in the ring," Trainer Kevin Barry admitted a loss at this level would result at the end of Parker's boxing career.

Come fight night Parker demonstrated far more aggression and intent than he had for sometime and knocked out Flores in the third round. However, the fight is marred with controversy, as Parker allegedly hit Flores below the belt several times, as he promised he would in a pre-fight interview. Barry declined suggestions the next fight would be against Junior Fa, his main rival when they were both amateur boxers.

=== Matchroom three-fight promotional deal ===
==== Parker vs. Leapai, Winters ====
On 31 May 2019, during the Anthony Joshua vs. Andy Ruiz Jr. fight week, a press conference was held in New York in which Parker announced he had signed a three-fight promotional contract with Matchroom Boxing USA which would see him fight on DAZN. Parker told the press, his six-year deal and relationship with Duco Events had ended in March 2019. He also advised his former promoter, David Higgins, would in return become part of his management team instead. It was reported that Parker would make his third appearance in the United States against 37-year-old and former two-time world title challenger Éric Molina. The fight was scheduled to take place on the undercard of Demetrius Andrade vs. Maciej Sulecki world title bout at the Dunkin' Donuts Center in Providence.

With two weeks notice, it was revealed that 39 year old Alex Leapai (32–7–4, 26 KOs) would be Parker's new opponent after the deal with Molina fell through during the signing stages. Parker weighed 241.5 pounds and Leapai, marking his U.S. debut, weighed 254.2 pounds.

Parker went on to win his second consecutive fight after suffering back-to-back defeats with a tenth-round stoppage. Parker started strong, landing heavy shots and nearly ending the fight early by rocking Leapai multiple times. Despite the aggression, Leapai managed to hold on through the barrage. Parker maintained control throughout the fight, showing speed and power. He effectively utilized his jab and combination punching, while Leapai focused mostly on defense, absorbing severe punishment without winning any rounds. The referee halted the bout in the tenth round after Parker unleashed a flurry of unanswered punches. By this time, Leapai had taken significant damage, and the decision was seen as necessary to prevent further harm. After the fight, Parker said, "I haven't been in the ring in half a year, and we got more rounds than I expected. But damn, he has a hard head. But I am very excited about my deal with Matchroom, and I look forward to putting on many more good performances in the future. When I started landing punches and he wouldn't go down, I knew this was going to be tough. I had to be patient and pick my shots to get the stoppage." Parker significantly outperformed Leapai in terms of punches landed, achieving 198 punches compared to Leapai's 42 during the entire fight. Parker specifically mentioned a potential rematch with Andy Ruiz, acknowledging Ruiz's belief that he won their previous encounter in 2016. Parker also congratulated Ruiz on his recent victory over Anthony Joshua. After the fight, Leapai announced his retirement, citing medical warnings about his eyesight.

Eddie Hearn confirmed Parker and former WBC title challenger Dereck Chisora would fight in London at The O2 Arena on 27 October. The bout would coheadline alongside Josh Taylor defending his IBF light welterweight world title against American Regis Prograis in the World Boxing Super Series final. It was later announced Parker had been forced to withdraw from his fight with Chisora due to a spider bite that was causing problems during training. A doctor's certificate was forwarded to Hearn whom also confirmed they would find a replacement opponent for Chisora.

On 4 February 2020, it was announced that Parker would make his long-awaited ring return against Shawndell Winters on 29 February on the undercard of Mikey Garcia vs. Jessie Vargas, at the Ford Center at The Star in Frisco, Texas. Winters was ranked 14th by the WBA at the time. Parker achieved a decisive victory over Winters with a fifth-round knockout. Parker began the fight dominantly, utilizing his jab and showcasing his hand speed. He mixed in strong left hooks, setting the tone early on. In the third, Parker dropped Winters with a powerful right hand towards the end of the round, although Winters managed to recover quickly. In round 4, both fighters exchanged blows, and Winters landed some effective punches, even causing a small cut on Parker's forehead. Parker controlled the fifth round and ultimately finished the fight dramatically, landing a right hand that visibly hurt Winters. He followed up with a combination that sent Winters crashing through the ropes, prompting the referee to stop the contest at the 2:40 mark of the round. After the fight, Parker expressed a mix of satisfaction and criticism towards his performance, recognizing that he got a bit too excited in pursuit of an early finish but still considering it a solid victory.

==== Parker vs. Fa ====
Parker and Junior Fa fought four times during their amateur careers, with two victories and two defeats each. Their first encounter was at the 2009 Boxing New Zealand National Championships held in Rotorua. The pair competed in the super-heavyweight final, Fa defeating Parker in an 8–4 decision. A month later Parker forced a second-round standing eight count and a points win over Fa in a Samoan Tsunami Boxing appeal event at the North Shore Events Centre, organized by David Tua. On 12 June, they met for a third time in an amateur world-class contest rematch. It showcased as the main event at The Night of the Young Champions from ABA Stadium in 2010. Parker won by a large margin of twelve points.

In their fourth contest, Fa and Parker fought in a do-or-die opportunity to secure a place at the 2012 Summer Olympics during the Oceania Boxing Championships in Canberra, Australia. Parker had four opponents in the super-heavyweight division, one being Fa. Parker was eliminated, Fa claiming a closely fought three-round encounter eleven points to eight. He dropped the first round 2–1 but came back strongly in the second to secure a decisive 3-point lead that he protected when the final three-minute joust ended in stalemate.

In September 2018, negotiations began between team Parker and team Fa for a potential fight in December 2018. The fight failed to materialise after the teams could not come to an agreement regarding the purse split, with Parker opting to fight Alexander Flores while Fa fought on the undercard against Rogelio Rossi. Talks between the teams resumed in early 2020, however, they quickly broke down after Parker claimed Fa's team "priced themselves out" while Fa's team reportedly claimed they were given a "lowball" offer. In August 2020, Fa's manager, Mark Keddell, said the fight was close to being agreed, stating, "We've sent our final offer to them today and in terms of the money I just cannot see it being a problem. We're talking pennies in the pound here. Junior is keen to fight. He wants to make it happen." On 5 October, New Zealand prime minister Jacinda Ardern announced that the COVID-19 lockdown for New Zealand was being lifted. The following day it was announced that the long-awaited bout is scheduled to take place on 11 December 2020 at the Spark Arena in Auckland. A month before the fight it was announced that Junior Fa was not medically fit to compete. Junior Fa team saw that Fa wasn't doing so well doing training and energy levels, so they decided to get some bloods done. The fight doctor for the event Dr David Renata said the bloods were not normal and that Junior required surgery. Due to the show being postponed, some of the undercard that was scheduled to be on the show had to go elsewhere to keep their fights going. On 18 December it was announced that Junior Fa surgery was successful and the show was rescheduled for 27 February 2021.

Heading into the fight, Parker was looking for a fourth consecutive stoppage. The WBO ranked Parker at No. 2 and Fa at No. 6. Parker weighed 240.1 pounds and Fa scaled in heavier at 260.4 pounds.

The fight went the 12 round distance with Parker claiming the victory via unanimous decision. The judges scorecards read 115–113, 117-111 and 119–109. There was an expected crowd of 12,000 fans in attendance. With winning, Parker also captured the WBO Oriental heavyweight title. The fight began with both boxers trying to gain each other's respect. Both landed power shots. The action was back and forth for the first few rounds. Parker and Fa managed to get the crowd on their feet with the action in the ring. The fight ended with more clinching which seemed to weaken the fight as it progressed. Fa was able to get his shots of during the clinches and Parker was more busy when there was no clinch. Referee John Conway did his job in separating the two many times throughout. In the last round, whilst in a clinch, Fa landed four uppercuts to Parker's head, repeatedly snapping his head back.

During the post-fight interviews, Parker praised Fa and his team, "Junior and his team did a great job. They came here to fight and it was a lot closer than we expected. Fa put on a great performance and had a great team behind him. That showed the ring rust, after over a year. Thank you to everyone for coming tonight." Fa talked about the cut, stating it was caused by an elbow. He also praised Parker, calling him a world class opponent. Fa felt he exposed Parker and his weaknesses and said he was the better boxer on the night.

=== Split from trainer Kevin Barry ===
On 4 March 2021, days following his win over Fa, Parker stated he had an amicable split with long-time trainer Kevin Barry. He said, "Without Kevin, I wouldn't be where I am today Together we made it to the very top. Kevin was with me every step of the way, guiding my progress inside and outside of the ring. So it is with genuine sadness that I confirm our partnership has come to an end." A week later, Parker announced he would be working with former middleweight world champion Andy Lee. Parker wanted to use more aggression in his fights and was one of the reasons to link up with Lee, as he had trained with Emanuel Steward in the Kronk Gym in Detroit. Tyson Fury made the recommendation to Parker's team.

==== Parker vs. Chisora ====
Joseph Parker vs. Derek Chisora had originally been scheduled to take place on 26 October 2019, but Parker was forced to pull out after suffering a spider bite injury. After the pair's respective fights against unbeaten opponents, Junior Fa and Oleksandr Usyk, Parker and Chisora agreed to reschedule their fight for 1 May 2021, where they would fight on Sky PPV in Manchester, England for the vacant WBO Inter-Continental heavyweight title. Chisora was ranked No. 15 by the WBC. The day before the fight, the event looked to be in jeopardy as Chisora threatened to pull out, after losing a coin toss that meant he would have to walk to the ring first, which he objected to. The dispute was resolved on the day of the fight, and the fight went ahead as planned.

On the night, Chisora started the fight strong, knocking Parker down in just seven seconds of the first round with a big right hand. He closed the distance and pressured his opponent in the early rounds, but Parker rallied back in the mid-to-late rounds, boxing well off the back foot and using his jab effectively to win a split decision, with scorecards of 115–113, 116–111 in his favour, and 115–113 in favour of Chisora.

==== Parker vs. Chisora II ====
Following the somewhat controversial split decision victory in their first in May, both Parker and Derek Chisora expressed interest in an immediate rematch. On 16 September 2021, it was announced that a rematch on 18 December, again at the Manchester Arena, this time it was being broadcast Speaking to BBC Sport in the build up Parker would suggest that he might retire if he lost the rematch, saying "I just want to beat him properly this time. If I can't beat Derek then I have to really look at myself and where I go from there."

Parker largely dominated the bout, landing many overhand rights and uppercuts that hurt Chisora. A big right uppercut from Parker had Chisora wobbling into the ropes, which the referee Howard Foster ruled a knockdown as the ropes had kept him up. Another uppercut sent Chisora down in the seventh and again in the eight. Chisora was again in trouble in the ninth, it appeared at one point that the referee was on the verge of stepping in and waving it off, but Chisora was able to the survive the round. Chisora appeared to be the fresher in the last two rounds but he was never able to hurt Parker. The bout went the full 12 rounds and the judges all scored the bout for Parker with scores of 115–110, 115–111 and 114–112 giving him a unanimous decision victory. According to CompuBox, Parker landed 144 punches with 31% accuracy, against Chisora's 122 punches with 26% accuracy.

Speaking in the ring after result, Parker said that "Derek always comes for war, he was one tough guy and never stopped coming forward until the end, we practised and practised that uppercut. What a Christmas present. I felt a lot stronger. It was important to start strong and not be negative from the beginning. You can see there are improvements to be made. Derek Chisora is a credit to the sport of boxing."Attention was drawn to the scorecards which were widely perceived to be overly generous to Chisora: reporters Mike Coppinger opined that "the judges were trying to rob" Parker, while Chris Mannix stated, "These are criminally, criminally, bad scorecards."

=== Signing with Boxxer ===
==== Parker vs. Joyce ====
On 3 August 2022, it was reported the fight was set and an official press conference would take place later in the week to formally announce Joe Joyce (14–0, 13 KOs) vs. Parker in a 12-round heavyweight contest on BT Sport Box Office in the UK. It was expected to take place on ESPN+ in the United States, this was later confirmed weeks later. There was a lot of back and forth trash talk at the presser. Most came from Joyce, who claimed Parker only took the fight because he had nowhere else to go. He knew the winner would ultimately be pushed towards a world title fight. Joyce also claimed it was the biggest fight of his career. The fight was billed as "Nowhere To Run". The fight was scheduled to take place at the AO Arena in Manchester, UK. On 31 August, the fight stakes were raised, following a joint request from Queensberry Promotions and BOXXER, the World Boxing Organisation approved the fight for their interim heavyweight title. As a former WBO titlist, Parker used this as additional motivation. Earlier in the year, he had turned down an IBF eliminator against Filip Hrgović. There was a rematch clause placed in the contract, only for Joyce, if Parker was able to beat him. Had Joyce won, Parker would not be able to activate a rematch clause. Parker claimed this showed weakness on team Joyce's side. According to Parker, when the fight was first being negotiated, there was no talk of a rematch clause. Parker credited his performance in the Chisora rematch, where he felt he performed much better than the first bout, indicating this was the reason for Joyce's team putting the clause in. Parker believed the fight would not have been agreed, had his team not agreed to the clause. Parker had a record of 3–0 at the AO Arena prior to the bout. Joyce weighed 271.6 pounds, sixteen pounds more than Parker, who came in at a career-high 255.4 pounds.

In a fast-paced bout in which both men landed power punches, Joyce was able to bloody Parker's nose and open a cut above his eye, fighting largely on the front foot and using his jab to set up his attacks, while Parker was able to work off the back foot, finding some success with the left hook and overhand right. In the eleventh round, Parker was knocked down by a powerful left hook. He was able to rise to his feet, but the referee deemed it unsafe for him to continue, halting the fight to declare Joyce the winner by eleventh-round knockout. With the result, Joyce became the first man to stop Parker, who had previously never been knocked out.

Joyce was active throughout the fight, in particular rounds between 6 and 11. Compubox stats showed he landed a total of 308 of his 844 shots thrown, 96 of which were body shots and a total of 106 jabs landed. His connect rate was 36.5%. Parker only landed 147 of his 566 thrown (26%). Speaking days after the fight, Parker told reporters, "Joe Joyce is right at the top. The pressure, the punches, the determination just to keep pushing, just respect for what he showed." He ranked Joyce above Joshua and Andy Ruiz.

==== Parker vs. Massey ====
Unwilling to let the third loss of his professional boxing career get in the way of re-gaining heavyweight world-championship status, Parker's next bout was announced on 21 December to fight Briton Jack Massey (20–1–0, 11 KOs) for the undercard of the Chris Eubank Jr vs. Liam Smith on 21 January 2023 at Manchester Arena in England under Boxxer Promotions, on pay-per-view. The fight was to be broadcast on free-to-air in Parker's home country, New Zealand. This also marked the first time one of Parker's would be free-to-air in New Zealand. Massey was stepping up making his heavyweight debut. Parker was confident he would win, but admitted, a loss would mean he would be out of world title contention. Speaking at the fight weeks press conference, Massey said the fight was his golden ticket and a win would change the course of his career. Ahead of the fight, Parker discussed how this comeback trial was similar to when he lost to Whyte in 2017. Following the loss, Parker went on a six fight win streak. Parker felt, he is now back at that position and wanted to stay busy, to fast track himself back into contention. Parker also said, of all the fights, a rematch with Whyte intrigued him the most. Parker had a 40-pound weight advantage over Massey, who weighed in 215 pounds, compared to Parker's weighed of 245 pounds.

Parker won the fight by way of unanimous decision after 10 rounds of boxing. The fight started off slow. Massey was cautious. Both landed shots. Round 2 and 3 were similar. Parker landed some hard hooks. Massey became more active. During the middle rounds, Parker continued to land hard shots. Massey had more success as well, landing combinations. From the seventh round, Parker seemed frustrated. Massey landed some clean shots in round 8, but referee Darren Sarjinson deducted a point off Massey for persistent holding. Parker finished the fight strong. He opened a cut above Massey's eye and landed clean uppercuts which also stumbled Massey. Massey tried to come on strong in the final moments, making little impact. The three judges scored the fight 96–93, 97–92, and 97–93, all in his favor.

==== Parker vs. Opelu ====
In an attempt to keep himself busy and in fighting shape, it was confirmed that Parker would fight just four months later, on 24 May 2023 at Margaret Court Arena in Melbourne, Australia, against former Australian heavyweight champion Faiga Opelu (15–3–2, 11 KOs) in a scheduled 10-round-bout to be broadcast live on Main Event PPV. The fight was originally scheduled to have the Commonwealth heavyweight title at stake, which would have meant the winner would have been the first from the Pacific to have won the title. This was Parker's first time fighting in Australia as a professional. Speaking to reporters, Parker felt every fight from now was important for his comeback trail and every fight was must win. Parker was a big favourite against Opelu. At the weigh in, Opelu stepped on the scale at 214 ¾ pounds. Parker came in at 239.9 pounds. This marked the first time since 2018, where Parker weighed below 240 pounds.

On fight night, Parker made short work of Opelu and won the fight by TKO in the 1st round. Parker started the fight quick and landed a flurry of punches followed by a right hand, which dropped Opelu. The time was 1 minute and 26 seconds when the referee waived the fight off.

==== Parker vs. Kean ====
On 28 September 2023, following a press release for Riyadh Season's debut event, headlined by Tyson Fury vs. Francis Ngannou, the undercard was made official. Amongst the card, it was announced that Parker would mark his third fight of the year against hard-hitting Canadian heavyweight boxer Simon "The Grizzly" Kean (23–1, 22 KOs) for the then vacant IBF and WBO Inter-Continental heavyweight titles. The event was scheduled to take place on 28 October on pay-per-view at the Kingdom Arena in Riyadh, Saudi Arabia. The bout was scheduled for 10 rounds. Parker weighed 250.1 pounds and Kean stepped on the scales at 255.1 pounds.

In emphatic fashion, Parker knocked out Kean with a massive uppercut in the third round to win the fight and become the IBF and WBO Inter-Continental heavyweight title holder. Parker began slow and patient, working out Kean style and tactics. By round 3, Parker landed uppercuts, which shook Kean and the end of the fight was not far ahead. The time of stoppage was 2 minute and 4 seconds. This would turn out to be Kean's final professional career fight, as on 30 January 2024, at the age of 35, Kean announced his retirement.

==== Parker vs. Wilder ====
On 15 November 2023, Riyadh Season announced a blockbuster card to take place at the Kingdom Arena on 23 December 2023. The headline for the event, billed as Day of Reckoning was Anthony Joshua vs. Otto Wallin, with Parker in the co-feature bout against former WBC champion Deontay Wilder (43–2–1, 42 KOs) in a 12-round non-title heavyweight fight. Many other heavyweight contenders such as Daniel Dubois, Jarrell Miller, Frank Sanchez and amongst others were also scheduled to appear on the card. The event was set up to further set up a future long-awaited showdown between Wilder and Joshua, with the assumption they both win their respective bouts. Many observers, including the boxers involved felt Parker and Wilder was the better fight on the card and should headline. Wilder made the case that both he and Parker were former world champions and said it was a more exciting fight. Wilder also suggested a coin flip to decide the main event, however nothing came from this. Parker's team were going into this fight knowing they were capable of forcing a stoppage. This marked Parker's fourth fight of the year, his busiest since 2016 where Parker fought five times. By the time of the fight, Wilder had not fought in 14 months, having last fought in October 2023, where he stopped Robert Helenius in round one. After the official press conference, Riyadh Season agreed terms with DAZN to broadcast the event on their pay-per-view platform in the UK, US and other worldwide markets. The price tag of £19.95 in the UK was met with praise from boxing fans. A price tag of US$39.99 was also confirmed for USA and Canada. TNT Sports Box Office and ESPN+ PPV later picked up the event in the UK and US, respectively.

With all the talk of the possible fight with Joshua, Wilder felt many were overlooking Parker as his opponent. Wilder felt he was taking the bigger risk of the two by fighting Parker. Eddie Hearn had already stated that Joshua would fight Wilder next rather than Filip Hrgović, who was also linked. Wilder felt there was more pressure on him than Joshua, as he had not been active for over 12 months heading into the fight. Also, the fact that Joshua-Wilder was a huge fight the boxing world had been looking forward to for at least seven years. When asked how the fight would go, Wilder said although he wouldn't look for the knockout, he still expected to win within four rounds. During a face-off segment, both boxers discussed Wilder's inactivity. Wilder brushed off any concerns about ring rust. Heading into the fight, DraftKings sportsbook had Wilder as a 6–1 favourite. The weigh in took place the day before, with Parker weighing in at 245.1 pounds. This was 5 pounds lighter than his previous fight. Wilder weighed 213 pounds.

On that night, Parker put on a career-best performance, out-boxing Wilder and winning the fight via unanimous decision by judges' scores of 118–111, 118–110, and 120–108. Some felt it was an easy win for Parker, considering Wilder's tactics and low output. Parker fought smart, out-boxed and out-worked Wilder in all the rounds. He also managed to stay clear of Wilder's right hand and in return landed his own power punches to the body and head. As the rounds went on, Parker gained more control, applied pressure and used his jab to set up shots to the head. Parker was courageous as the rounds continued, catching Wilder with eye-catching shots and working him against the ropes. Despite the pre-fight talk, Wilder did show ring-rust. His shots were thrown with little accuracy and did not let his right hand go. The action heated up in round 7, when Parker had Wilder against ropes and landed a triple hook to the head. Parker then had Wilder hurt again in round 8 when he threw more heavy shots, whilst Wilder was against the ropes. Wilder had to force a hold to avoid further punishment. From that point, Wilder's legs became unstable. According to Compubox, Wilder landed 39 of his 204 punches thrown (19.1%) and Parker landed 89 of his 255 thrown (34.9%). Parker landed more than double the amount of power shots through the 12 rounds.

Parker beating Wilder, seemed to derail his future fight against Joshua. Parker said, "We trained very hard for this. Everyone had other plans, but this is God's plan. I was really fit. I stayed calm, relaxed, stayed focused. There's always things to work on but I got the win. Merry Christmas to us." Wilder said despite the loss, he was very happy. He was unsure why he was unable to let his hands go and said his timing was off. Parker admitted he did catch a few of Wilder's right hands, saying he did punch hard. Despite Wilder losing, Joshua stopped Wallin in their fight, and although the fight would not likely happen next, Joshua was hopeful the fight could still happen in the future, as the fans deserved it.

=== WBO interim heavyweight champion ===
==== Parker vs. Zhang ====
On 15 January 2024, only weeks after defeating Wilder, it was announced that Parker would challenge WBO interim heavyweight champion Zhilei Zhang (26–1–1, 21 KOs), with the fight scheduled to occur on 8 March, as the co-main event of the Knockout Chaos event headlined by Anthony Joshua vs. Francis Ngannou, at Riyadh's Kingdom Arena. A formal press conference would later confirm the event. Zhang was coming off impressive back-to-back stoppage wins over Joe Joyce, who had previously stopped Parker in 2022. Speaking of Parker, Zhang didn't believe he would agree to a fight with him so quickly. He called Parker a warrior who doesn't back down from any challenge. Despite Wilder being a favourite, Zhang correctly predicted that Parker would beat Wilder by decision in their meeting. Zhang expected to wear down Parker over the rounds, just as Joyce before him also did. Joyce came forward with constant pressure, which broke Parker mentally down the stretch, causing the stoppage. Zhang predicted he would stop Parker in their fight. A rematch clause was included in the contract for Zhang, meaning had he lost, he would be able to activate an immediate rematch with Parker. This was due to his status with the WBO, being interim champion. There was a 44 pounds weight difference between the two. Zhang weighed 291.6 pounds and Parker came in at 247.6 pounds. Many felt the build up to the fight went below the radar due to the headline.

Parker got knocked down twice, but won the fight by majority decision. One judge had the fight even at 113–113, while the other two judges had it 114–112 and 115–111 to Parker. Zhang knocked Parker down in rounds three and eight, but was out-boxed in most of the other 10 rounds. Zhang looked tired most of the fight, some observers put this down to his weight, coming in heavy, made him slower and not attack as much as he did in both his fights against Joyce. Parker won majority of the second half by being a bit busier than Zhang, who was being patient, but looked like he wanted to land the knockout blow. The first knockdown occurred in round three, when Zhang landed a straight left to Parker's head. He was not able to capitalise on this. The second knockdown in round eight, was a right hook to the top of Parker's head. Following the fight, Parker spoke about the rematch clause, being open to it as he was contractually obliged to, and stated they would do it again. According to CompuBox, Parker landed 79 power shots and Zhang only connected with 40 power shots.

Instead going for an immediate rematch, Zhang instead, representing Queensberry Promotions fought and knocked out former WBC champion Deontay Wilder on 1 June 2024. This was part of the 5 vs. 5 Queensberry vs. Matchroom Boxing card under the Riyadh Season banner. On 26 July, despite not taking an immediate rematch with Parker, Zhang confirmed the clause was still active and he fully intended to take the rematch to avenge his loss.

==== Cancelled Daniel Dubois fight ====
Following Dubois stoppage victory over Anthony Joshua, Joshua opted out of the rematch which was to take place in February 2025. This was due to injuries and the likeliness of not having enough time to prepare for the rematch. Promoter Frank Warren revealed Dubois would be making a defence of his IBF belt in February regardless. The IBF gave Dubois and his team the green light to make a voluntary defence, with an expiry of 22 April 2025. Hearn stated Joshua would wait for the outcome of the heavyweight rematch between Oleksandr Usyk vs. Tyson Fury before making his next move. This opened up a list of potential opponents for Dubois, including Joseph Parker. At the same time, Agit Kabayel and Martin Bakole had been ordered by the IBF for a final eliminator. Parker was leading the way to capture the fight.

On 2 December 2024 Riyadh Season announced a blockbuster card to take place at the Kingdom Arena. In the co-feature bout, Parker would challenge for the IBF heavyweight title against Daniel Dubois (22–2, 21 KOs). The card is scheduled to take place on 22 February 2025. On 10 January 2025, Ring Magazine reported that Parker would automatically lose his status as interim WBO champion once the opening bell rings. This is a standard rule within sanctioning bodies as the interim title is classed as a secondary title and not eligible to unify with full champions from another organisation. The president said they would allow him to enter the ring and be introduced as the interim WBO champion, but would become vacant soon after.

==== Parker vs. Bakole ====
Dubois attended the media workouts on Tuesday, however Ring Magazine reported the following day that he fell ill and being assessed by doctors to see if he would be able to make his title defence against Parker. The names of Lawrence Okolie, David Adeleye and Mourad Aliev were brought up as a possible replacement. Dubois was absent from the press conference, but Parker still attended. Shortly afterwards, much to everyone's surprise, Martin Bakole (21–1, 16 KOs) was named as the replacement. He had to fly in from the Congo and borrowed Dubois' gloves for the fight. Bakole missed the weigh in due to travel. He would land in Riyadh at 02:00 local time on Saturday. Parker weighed in a career high 267 pounds. As a joke, he faced off with Frank Warren, in place of Bakole. On the night, Parker defeated Bakole by 2nd-round TKO to retain his WBO interim title. Parker effectively utilized his jab to control the pace of the fight while being cautious of Bakole's power. Towards the end of the first round, Bakole connected with a strong right hand that briefly unsettled Parker, instilling a moment of confidence in Bakole. In the second round, Parker increased his aggression, utilizing his jab and closing the distance between them. Although Bakole landed a couple of significant body shots, Parker quickly regained his composure and delivered a right hand that impacted Bakole's head, causing him to lose his balance and fall. Although Bakole used the ropes to aid his rise, the referee halted the match at 2:17 of the second round, resulting in a knockout victory for Parker. After the fight, Parker praised Bakole for accepting the fight on such short notice, adding that he intended to pursue a world title bout next. Bakole acknowledged the risk he took and cited financial motivation as a factor in accepting the fight despite being unprepared. It was believed that his purse for the fight was $600,000 and Parker took a $2 million purse.

On 13 March, WBO president Gustavo Olivieri ordered for Oleksandr Usyk to make a mandatory defence against interim champion Parker. Both parties were given 30 days to negotiate a deal before purse bids are called. On 4 April, Daniel Dubois told Ring Magazine the priority was to fight Usyk in July. Dubois did not rule out fighting Parker or Derek Chisora, who was ranked No. 2 by the IBF. The IBF stated they would grant an exception for Dubois vs. Usyk, however if the fight did not materialise, then Chisora would be called as mandatory. On 10 April, the WBO received a petition to allow Dubois vs. Usyk to take place for the undisputed title. On 27 April, the rematch between Usyk vs. Dubois was announced to take place on 19 July 2025. WBO president Gustavo Olivier explained his organisation's decision to allow the unification fight as it allowed the heavyweight division to once again crown an undisputed champion. Parker would be called next as mandatory challenger, however, once the fight is over.

==== Parker vs. Wardley ====
On 24 July 2025, the WBO officially re-ordered Oleksandr Usyk to make a mandatory defence against Parker. As of 1 August, Usyk had not entered negotiations for a fight. On 14 August, Frank Warren stated that Usyk requested an extension because of an injury. On 1 September, The Ring magazine announced a fight between Parker and British contender Fabio Wardley was in the works to take place on 25 October 2025, at The O2 Arena in London. Parker's team confirmed his arrival in Dublin a few days prior to suggest he had begun a training camp. On 6 September, the fight was officially announced, to headline a DAZN PPV card. Warren commended both boxers for not postponing their pursuit of a world title and instead engaging in a high-stakes fight against each other. The WBO provided Usyk with a 90-day extension a day later, but determined that he must compete against the victor of the Parker-Wardley match next. Warren and DAZN executives underscored the importance of this fight as a significant event in the heavyweight division beyond the undisputed title scene, indicating that it served as a pivotal contest for future championship positioning. Parker weighed in at 262.4 pounds while Wardley weighed 242.7 pounds.

In front of more than 10,000 fans, Parker lost in a dramatic eleventh-round stoppage, allowing Wardley to win the WBO interim championship and become Usyk's mandatory challenger. Parker began the fight strongly, utilizing a sharp jab and combinations, even landing a substantial punch at the end of the round. Wardley reacted with aggression, delivering overhand rights and body shots that visibly affected Parker. Before the halfway point, Wardley had a bloodied nose. In the middle rounds, Parker regained his rhythm and landed effective power punches. During the eighth and ninth rounds, Parker was dominant, delivering combinations that wobbled Wardley. However, Wardley countered with uppercuts and hooks, causing damage to Parker before the bell sounded. The fight concluded when Parker was struck by a right hand and faced a series of relentless attacks. While against the ropes and still attempting to fight back, referee Howard Foster intervened and stopped the fight.

At the time of stoppage, two judges had Parker ahead 98–92, 96–94, and the third judge had it 95–95, even. After the fight, Wardley said he wanted to fight Usyk next and paid respect to Parker, stating, “All credit to Joseph Parker. That man can’t get enough respect from me. He deserves world respect from the boxing community." The stoppage generated controversy as Parker seemed able to continue, but Foster ended the fight following Wardley's combination, resulting in differing opinions among fans, media, and Parker. He said, “I felt fine when they stopped the fight but I’m not the referee. I wanted to carry on, of course. It sucks losing the fight. I’m not going to sit here and pretend I’m all happy about it, but life goes on." His trainer Andy Lee said, “Joe was taking a lot shots but a lot of them he was blocking and slipping but he was taking some and there was an opportunity for the fight to be stopped and he stopped it. “Do I think it was fair? It was a battle wasn’t it? You know, it could have been the other way around, one punch here or there." According to CompuBox statistics, Wardley landed 166 of 437 punches (38%) and Parker landed 132 of 393 (34%). Wardley was busier in the last two rounds, landing 35 shots, compared to Parker, who only managed 13 connects.

=== Drugs-test controversy ===
On 14 November 2025, it was reported that Parker tested positive for cocaine metabolite benzoylecgonine on the day of the fight. The test was conducted by VADA, and the details were forwarded to UKAD and the BBBofC for further action concerning doping violations. Although cocaine is not classified as a performance-enhancing drug, Parker could potentially face a two-year suspension. The reports also suggested that Parker would have taken the drug during fight week. Parker denied taking any prohibited substances and claimed he does not use performance-enhancing drugs. He was surprised at the adverse result and was cooperating with the ongoing investigation, confident it will clear his name. His manager, Spencer Brown, was not happy with how long it was taking for the case to be resolved and asked for faster drug-testing procedures to prevent boxers from being inactive for too long. In August 2026, Parker stated that he was "pleased to confirm" that his suspension had been lifted and that he would be "back in the ring soon". The BBBofC confirmed lifting of the suspension but declined to comment further while the details of the case were being finalized. His manager Higgins argued that Parker remained "at the peak of his powers". Parker was now a free agent, wanting to return to the ring before the end of 2026. A statement was later released by UKAD, who confirmed that Parker had completed a 3-month ban and was able to resume his career. During the investigation, Parker submitted evidence relating to a nutritionist employed during his training camp, who admitted to regular cocaine use. An independent expert concluded that Parker's ingestion of cocaine had most likely occurred out of competition, and UKAD determined that any use was "in a context unrelated to sports performance".

== Personal life ==
Parker goes by the high chief name of Lupesoliai La'auliolemalietoa. Contrary to reports that the emerging star was bestowed a matai (chief) title, the village of Faleula revealed to him the name to bestow upon him the chiefly title of La'auli. The paramount chief of the village, Loau Keneti Sio, urged him to be a "strong man". He bestowed his blessings on Parker, reminding him that the bestowed title is a gift and a "blessing to him from the village". Loau said informing him that he has been chosen to be bestowed the title La'auli is a sign of respect. It is also a thank you from the village for what he has achieved for Samoa.

Samoa Prime Minister Tuilaepa Aiono Sailele Malielegaoi awarded Parker the Order of Merit Award at the 2017 Government's Honours and Awards. He was the youngest recipient of an award at the ceremony. The Prime Minister also announced the government of Samoa would host a special welcome for Parker, with a half day commission holiday.

As of 2022, Parker and his partner have four daughters.

== Professional boxing record ==
40 fights	36 wins	4 losses
By knockout	24	2
By decision	12	2

No.	Result	Record	Opponent	Type	Round, time	Date	Location	Notes
40	Loss	36–4	Fabio Wardley	TKO	11 (12), 1:54	25 Oct 2025	The O2 Arena, London, England	Lost WBO interim heavyweight title
39	Win	36–3	Martin Bakole	TKO	2 (12), 2:15	22 Feb 2025	The Venue Riyadh Season, Riyadh, Saudi Arabia	Retained WBO interim heavyweight title
38	Win	35–3	Zhilei Zhang	MD	12	8 Mar 2024	Kingdom Arena, Riyadh, Saudi Arabia	Won WBO interim heavyweight title
37	Win	34–3	Deontay Wilder	UD	12	23 Dec 2023	Kingdom Arena, Riyadh, Saudi Arabia	Retained WBO Inter-Continental heavyweight title; Won vacant WBC International heavyweight title
36	Win	33–3	Simon Kean	KO	3 (10), 2:04	28 Oct 2023	Kingdom Arena, Riyadh, Saudi Arabia	Won vacant IBF and WBO Inter-Continental heavyweight titles
35	Win	32–3	Faiga Opelu	TKO	1 (10), 1:29	24 May 2023	Margaret Court Arena, Melbourne, Australia	
34	Win	31–3	Jack Massey	UD	10	21 Jan 2023	Manchester Arena, England	
33	Loss	30–3	Joe Joyce	KO	11 (12), 1:03	24 Sep 2022	Manchester Arena, Manchester, England	For vacant WBO interim heavyweight title
32	Win	30–2	Derek Chisora	UD	12	18 Dec 2021	Manchester Arena, Manchester, England	Retained WBO Inter-Continental heavyweight title
31	Win	29–2	Derek Chisora	SD	12	1 May 2021	Manchester Arena, Manchester, England	Won vacant WBO Inter-Continental heavyweight title
30	Win	28–2	Junior Fa	UD	12	27 Feb 2021	Spark Arena, Auckland, New Zealand	Won vacant WBO Oriental heavyweight title
29	Win	27–2	Shawndell Winters	TKO	5 (10), 2:40	29 Feb 2020	Ford Center at The Star, Frisco, Texas, US	
28	Win	26–2	Alex Leapai	TKO	10 (12), 2:18	29 Jun 2019	Dunkin' Donuts Center, Providence, Rhode Island, US	
27	Win	25–2	Alexander Flores	KO	3 (12), 2:51	15 Dec 2018	Horncastle Arena, Christchurch, New Zealand	
26	Loss	24–2	Dillian Whyte	UD	12	28 Jul 2018	The O2 Arena, London, England	For WBC Silver and vacant WBO International heavyweight titles
25	Loss	24–1	Anthony Joshua	UD	12	31 Mar 2018	Millennium Stadium, Cardiff, Wales	Lost WBO heavyweight title; For WBA (Super), IBF, and IBO heavyweight titles
24	Win	24–0	Hughie Fury	MD	12	23 Sep 2017	Manchester Arena, Manchester, England	Retained WBO heavyweight title
23	Win	23–0	Răzvan Cojanu	UD	12	6 May 2017	Vodafone Events Centre, Auckland, New Zealand	Retained WBO heavyweight title
22	Win	22–0	Andy Ruiz Jr.	MD	12	10 Dec 2016	Vector Arena, Auckland, New Zealand	Won vacant WBO heavyweight title
21	Win	21–0	Alexander Dimitrenko	KO	3 (12), 1:38	1 Oct 2016	Vodafone Events Centre, Auckland, New Zealand	Retained WBO Oriental heavyweight title
20	Win	20–0	Solomon Haumono	TKO	4 (12), 1:35	21 Jul 2016	Horncastle Arena, Christchurch, New Zealand	Retained WBC-OPBF and WBO Oriental heavyweight titles
19	Win	19–0	Carlos Takam	UD	12	21 May 2016	Vodafone Events Centre, Auckland, New Zealand	
18	Win	18–0	Jason Bergman	TKO	8 (12), 1:02	23 Jan 2016	Faleata Sports Complex, Apia, Samoa	Retained WBO Oriental heavyweight title
17	Win	17–0	Daniel Martz	TKO	1 (12), 1:57	5 Dec 2015	Claudelands Arena, Hamilton, New Zealand	Retained WBO Oriental heavyweight title
16	Win	16–0	Kali Meehan	TKO	3 (12), 1:00	15 Oct 2015	The Trusts Arena, Auckland, New Zealand	Retained WBA-PABA, WBC-OPBF, WBO Africa, and WBO Oriental heavyweight titles; Won vacant WBA Oceania and EPBC heavyweight titles
15	Win	15–0	Bowie Tupou	KO	1 (12), 1:03	1 Aug 2015	Stadium Southland, Invercargill, New Zealand	Retained WBA-PABA and WBO Oriental heavyweight titles; Won vacant WBC-OPBF and WBO Africa heavyweight titles
14	Win	14–0	Yakup Saglam	TKO	2 (12), 0:45	13 Jun 2015	Arena Manawatu, Palmerston North, New Zealand	Retained WBA-PABA and WBO Oriental heavyweight titles
13	Win	13–0	Jason Pettaway	KO	4 (10), 0:48	5 Mar 2015	Vodafone Events Centre, Auckland, New Zealand	Retained WBA-PABA and WBO Oriental heavyweight titles
12	Win	12–0	Irineu Beato Costa Junior	KO	4 (12), 0:31	6 Dec 2014	Claudelands Arena, Hamilton, New Zealand	Retained WBA-PABA and WBO Oriental heavyweight titles
11	Win	11–0	Sherman Williams	UD	10	16 Oct 2014	The Trusts Arena, Auckland, New Zealand	Retained WBA-PABA and WBO Oriental heavyweight titles
10	Win	10–0	Keith Thompson	TKO	3 (6), 2:41	9 Aug 2014	Sands Bethlehem Event Center, Bethlehem, Pennsylvania, US	
9	Win	9–0	Brian Minto	RTD	7 (10), 3:00	5 Jul 2014	Vodafone Events Centre, Auckland, New Zealand	Retained WBA-PABA heavyweight title; Won WBO Oriental heavyweight title
8	Win	8–0	Marcelo Nascimento	TKO	7 (10), 2:21	26 Apr 2014	König Pilsener Arena, Oberhausen, Germany	Won WBA-PABA interim heavyweight title
7	Win	7–0	Afa Tatupu	TKO	2 (10), 1:55	10 Oct 2013	The Trusts Arena, Auckland, New Zealand	Won NZNBF heavyweight title
6	Win	6–0	Francois Botha	TKO	2 (8), 2:32	13 Jun 2013	The Trusts Arena, Auckland, New Zealand	
5	Win	5–0	Brice Ritani-Coe	UD	6	16 May 2013	Hyatt Regency, Irvine, California, US	
4	Win	4–0	Dontay Pati	TKO	1 (6), 1:32	28 Feb 2013	Hornby Working Men's Club, Christchurch, New Zealand	
3	Win	3–0	Richard Tutaki	TKO	3 (6), 0:59	15 Dec 2012	The Trusts Arena, Auckland, New Zealand	
2	Win	2–0	Terry Tuteru	KO	2 (4), 1:49	9 Nov 2012	The Trusts Arena, Auckland, New Zealand	
1	Win	1–0	Dean Garmonsway	TKO	2 (6), 1:49	5 Jul 2012	SkyCity Convention Centre, Auckland, New Zealand	

== Titles in boxing ==
=== Major world titles ===
- WBO heavyweight champion (200+ lbs)

=== Interim world titles ===
- WBO interim heavyweight champion (200+ lbs)

=== Regional/International titles ===
- WBC International heavyweight champion (200+ lbs)
- IBF Inter-Continental heavyweight champion (200+ lbs)
- WBO Inter-Continental heavyweight champion (200+ lbs) (2x)
- WBA Oceania heavyweight champion (200+ lbs)
- WBA-PABA heavyweight champion (200+ lbs)
- WBA-PABA interim heavyweight champion (200+ lbs)
- WBC-OPBF heavyweight champion (200+ lbs)
- WBC-EPBC heavyweight champion (200+ lbs)
- WBO Oriental heavyweight champion (200+ lbs) (2x)
- WBO Africa heavyweight champion (200+ lbs)
- NZNBF heavyweight champion (200+ lbs)

== Pay-per-view bouts ==
No.	Date	Fight	Country	Network	Buys	Source(s)
1	31 March 2018	Anthony Joshua vs. Joseph Parker	United Kingdom	Sky Box Office	1,832,000	
2	28 July 2018	Dillian Whyte vs. Joseph Parker	United Kingdom	Sky Box Office	571,000	
3	1 May 2021	Derek Chisora vs. Joseph Parker	United Kingdom	Sky Box Office	145,000	
4	24 September 2022	Joe Joyce vs. Joseph Parker	United Kingdom	BT Sport Box Office		
5	25 October 2025	Joseph Parker vs. Fabio Wardley	United Kingdom	DAZN PPV		
Total sales					2,548,000	

== Filmography ==
Title	Year	Role	Network	Notes	Ref.
Step Into the Ring	2012	Himself	YouTube	Documentary	
Fresh TV	2014	Himself	TV2	Season 4 (Episode 6)	
Jono and Ben	2015	Next Actor	TV3	Season 4 (Episode 18)	
Parker v Ruiz Jr: A Fighting Chance	2016	Himself	Prime	Documentary	
Boxing After Dark	2016	Himself	HBO	Season 13 (Episode 1)	
Fresh TV	2017	Himself	TV2	Season 7 (Episode 2)	
ITM Hook Me Up!	2017	Himself	Prime	Season 1 (Episode 1)	
Joseph Parker: Full Access	2017	Himself	Sky Sport	Documentary	
Joseph Parker: Metamorphosis	2018	Himself	Sky Sport	Documentary	

== Awards and recognitions ==
- 2011 New Zealand Pacific Island Sports Emerging Talent Award
- 2012 Samoan Sports Junior Sportsman of the Year
- 2013 New Zealand Pacific Island Sports Sportsman of the Year
- 2015 Honoured Matai title of Lupesoliai La'auliolemalietoa
- 2015 World Boxing Organization Oriental Heavyweight Fighter of the Year
- 2015 6th Rated ESPN Prospect of the Year
- 2016 Order of Merit of Samoa
- 2017 Counties Manukau Sporting Excellence Sportsman of the Year
- 2017 Counties Manukau Sporting Excellence Sportsperson of the Year

Sporting positions
Regional boxing titles
Preceded by Afa Tatupu	NZNBF heavyweight champion 10 October 2013 – November 2015; Vacated	Vacant Title next held by Hemi Ahio
Vacant Title last held by Billy Wright	PABA heavyweight champion Interim title 26 April 2014 – 5 July 2014; Promoted	Vacant Title next held by Solomon Haumono
Vacant Title last held by Ruslan Chagaev	PABA heavyweight champion 5 July 2014 – October 2015; Stripped	Vacant Title next held by Solomon Haumono
Preceded by Brian Minto	WBO Oriental heavyweight champion 5 July 2014 – 10 December 2016; Won world title	Vacant Title next held by Zhilei Zhang
Vacant Title last held by Kevin Johnson	OPBF heavyweight champion 1 August 2015 – 10 December 2016; Vacated	Vacant Title next held by Kyotaro Fujimoto
Preceded by Bowie Tupou	WBO Africa heavyweight champion 1 August 2015 – July 2016; Vacated	Vacant Title next held by Izu Ugonoh
Vacant Title last held by Izu Ugonoh	WBA Oceania heavyweight champion 15 October 2015 – 4 April 2016; Vacated	Vacant Title next held by Zhang Junlong
Vacant Title last held by Lucas Browne	EPBC heavyweight champion 15 October 2015 – 8 April 2016; Vacated	Vacant Title next held by Sergey Kuzmin
Vacant Title last held by Zhilei Zhang	WBO Oriental heavyweight champion 27 February 2021 – 1 May 2021; Vacated	Vacant Title next held by Justis Huni
Vacant Title last held by Oleksandr Usyk	WBO Inter-Contiental heavyweight champion 1 May 2021 – September 2022; Vacated	Vacant Title next held by Himself
Vacant Title last held by Demsey McKean	IBF Inter-Contiental heavyweight champion 28 October 2023 – February 2024; Vacated	Vacant Title next held by Peter Kadiru
Vacant Title last held by Himself	WBO Inter-Contiental heavyweight champion 28 October 2023 – 8 March 2024; Won interim world title	Vacant Title next held by Moses Itauma
Vacant Title last held by Zhan Kossobutskiy	WBC International heavyweight champion 23 December 2023 – 8 March 2024; Vacated	Vacant Title next held by Alexander Nedbei
World boxing titles
Vacant Title last held by Tyson Fury	WBO heavyweight champion 10 December 2016 – 31 March 2018	Succeeded by Anthony Joshua
Preceded by Zhilei Zhang	WBO heavyweight champion Interim title 8 March 2024 – 25 October 2025	Succeeded by Fabio Wardley
