= David Tua vs Shane Cameron =

Boxing competition

Fight of the Century
- Date: 3 October 2009
- Venue: Mystery Creek Events Centre
- Title(s) on the line: WBO Asia Pacific & WBO Oriental Heavyweight titles

Tale of the tape
Boxer	(Samoa) (New Zealand) David Tua	(New Zealand) Shane Cameron
Nickname	Tuaman	The Mountain Warrior
Hometown	Faleasiu, Samoa	Gisborne, New Zealand
Purse	$500,000	$500,000
Pre-fight record	49-3-1	23-1-0
Height	5 ft 10 in (1.78 m)	6 ft 2 in (1.88 m)
Weight	107.8 kg (238 lb)	103.5 kg (228 lb)
Recognition	None	WBO Asia Pacific, WBO Oriental Heavyweight and IBF Pan Pacific Heavyweight titles WBO ranked 6th, IBF ranked 15th

Result
- David Tua win by Knockout, 20 seconds into the 2nd round

David Tua vs Shane Cameron, billed as Fight of the Century was a boxing match between David Tua and Shane Cameron. This is considered the biggest boxing event in New Zealand history with a million dollar purse. It took place on 3 October 2009 at Mystery Creek Events Centre in Hamilton, New Zealand. Tua won the fight by knockout 20 seconds into the second round. The event was promoted by David Higgins and John McRae of Duco Events.

== History ==
=== Background ===
In 2008, Shane Cameron called out David Tua to fight in a boxing bout. In November 2008, Duco Events made an offer towards the two boxers to make the fight happen, however, Shane Cameron's team were unhappy with the date and money that was offered. In December 2008, Tua signed the contract for the fight to happen, however, Cameron had not signed as of yet. But it was confirmed that both boxers were guaranteed $500,000. In January 2009, David Higgins announced that the fight will happen in June 2009. In February 2009, It was announced that the fight would take place at Waikato Stadium, in Hamilton, New Zealand. In March 2009, Shane Cameron had a warm up fight against American Robert Davis. Unfortunately, during his fight with Davis, Cameron injured his hand. Due to the severity of the injury, Cameron required to have surgery on the hand, subsequently postponing the event. In April 2009, it was announced that the fight was postponed until October, with the venue changed to Mystery Creek Events Centre. A few day before the event, David Tua's home-country of Samoa was hit by an earthquake and tsunami. Tua's aunt died in the disaster.

== Fight card ==
Weight Class	Weight		vs.		Method	Round	Time	Notes
Heavyweight	200+ lbs.	(New Zealand) (Samoa) David Tua	def.	(New Zealand) Shane Cameron	KO	2/12	0:20	^{Note 1}
Heavyweight	200+ lbs.	(Australia) (New Zealand) Colin Wilson	def.	(Australia) (Tonga) John Hopoate	KO	4/8	1:00	^{Note 2}
Heavyweight	200+ lbs.	(Australia) Daniel Ammann	def.	(Australia) (Samoa) Lawrence Tauasa	UD	6/6	3:00
Light Heavyweight	175 lbs.	(New Zealand) Shane Chapman	drew	(Australia) Soulan Pownceby	TD	3/6	1:40
Super Welterweight	154 lbs.	(New Zealand) Steve Heremaia	def.	(Australia) Frank LoPorto	UD	6/6	3:00
Heavyweight	200+ lbs.	(New Zealand) (Ghana) Moyoyo Mensah	def.	(United States) Max Alexander	UD	6/6	3:00

^Note 1 For WBO Oriental & Asia Pacific Heavyweight titles
^Note 2 For Australian National Heavyweight title

== Fight details ==
David Tua vs Shane Cameron was held at Mystery Creek Events Centre in Hamilton, New Zealand. Tickets went on sale with prices going between $69 and $399 per person. It was also announced in May 2009 that the fight will be broadcast live on Sky TV PPV. It was confirmed that 7500 tickets were sold (750 corporate tables of 10 people), and 88,000 Pay Per Views buys for the event. The PPV buys were considered a world record on a per-capita country basis. The announcer of the night was Daniel Hennessey, who made his boxing announcing debut.

New Zealand Born Philippines resident Bruce McTavish served as the referee, with American Robert Byrd, Thailand's Pinit Prayadsab and Australian Brad Vocale as the ringside judges. New Zealander Pat Leonard served as the supervisor and representative for the WBO.

=== Broadcasting ===
International broadcasters
Country	Broadcaster
New Zealand	Sky Pay Per View
Australia	Main Event

=== Weigh-in ===
The weigh-in was held on 2 October 2009, at Sky City in Hamilton. David Tua weighed in at 107.8 kg, losing 26 kg for the fight. Cameron weighed in at 103.5 kg.

== Aftermath ==
Tua won the bout by knockout in the second round. After the fight, Tua received a ranking of fourth in the WBO, and fifteenth in the IBF. Tua was in a broadcasting fight contract exclusively with Maori TV, which meant he could not fight overseas. Tua went on to fight Friday Ahunanya in March 2010, winning by unanimous decision. Cameron went on to fight John Hopoate in March 2010, winning by disqualification. David Tua retired in November 2013, and Shane Cameron retired in November 2014. Tua and Cameron are now long-time friends.
