= Deontay Wilder vs. Tyson Fury =

Boxing competition

- Date: December 1, 2018
- Venue: Staples Center, Los Angeles, California, U.S.
- Title on the line: WBC heavyweight title

Tale of the tape
Boxer	Deontay Wilder	Tyson Fury
Nickname	The Bronze Bomber	The Gypsy King
Hometown	Tuscaloosa, Alabama, U.S.	Manchester, England
Purse	$4,000,000	$3,000,000
Pre-fight record	40–0 (39 KO)	27–0 (19 KO)
Age	33 years, 1 month	30 years, 3 months
Height	6 ft 7 in (201 cm)	6 ft 9 in (206 cm)
Weight	212 1/2 lb (96 kg)	256 1/2 lb (116 kg)
Style	Orthodox	Orthodox
Recognition	WBC; Heavyweight Champion; The Ring/TBRB; No. 2 Ranked Heavyweight	Lineal; Heavyweight Champion; WBC; No. 3 Ranked Heavyweight; The Ring; No. 7 Ranked Heavyweight; TBRB; No. 8 Ranked Heavyweight

Result
- 12-round split draw (115–111, 112–114, 113–113)

Deontay Wilder vs. Tyson Fury was a professional boxing match contested on December 1, 2018, for the WBC Heavyweight Championship.

== Background ==
The potential match up between Wilder and Fury had been talked about and promoted for several years prior to the fight, including by the two fighters themselves on social media. The pair's first encounter had taken place off camera at the Motorpoint Arena in Sheffield in April 2013, where Wilder knocked out Audley Harrison on the undercard of Amir Khan vs. Julio Diaz, with both Wilder and Fury promising each other a fight in the future. Wilder became the first American heavyweight world champion in nearly a decade in January 2015, after defeating Bermane Stiverne via unanimous decision in Las Vegas to pick up the WBC title, the only world heavyweight title at the time that was not held by the reigning champion Wladimir Klitschko. Fury then became champion in his first world title attempt by defeating Klitschko for the WBA, IBF, WBO, The Ring and lineal titles in Düsseldorf, Germany later that year in November 2015, ending Klitschko's decade long reign with a unanimous decision victory.

Wilder made the third defence of his title in January 2016 against Artur Szpilka at the Barclays Center in New York, a fight in which Fury was in attendance. At the end of the fight after Wilder had knocked out Szpilka in devastating fashion, in an attempt to build a future fight Fury jumped into the ring and there was a face-to-face confrontation between the two men, this time in front of the onlooking crowd and a live television audience. Fury grabbed the microphone and told Wilder, "There's only one Tyson Fury, what you got to say about that, Deontay?" Wilder replied "we all know, Fury, this is just an act, I ain't scared of nobody and I'll come to your backyard for that fight, baby!" Fury continued the exchange, "any time any place anywhere, when you're ready, I'll fight you in your back garden like I done Klitschko I'll beat you, you bum! You're a bum!" With several people now separating the pair, Fury took off his jacket and threw it to the ground whilst pacing up and down talking to Wilder across the ring. Wilder took the microphone again to tell Fury, "I don't play this, you can run around like you're a preacher and all that but I promise you when you step in this ring I will baptise you!"

After their confrontation in New York, a fight between the two had seemed inevitable in the near future but with Wilder obliged to face mandatory challenger Alexander Povetkin next and Fury bound by a contractual rematch clause with Klitschko the fight would have to wait, at least until the end of the year. However, the coming months saw Fury postpone the Klitschko rematch twice, firstly due to an ankle injury in June which saw the rematch put back from July 9 to October 29 before Fury postponed a second time in September after being declared medically unfit following a positive test for cocaine. This led to Fury vacating his remaining titles in October 2016 and further problems with depression, alcohol and excessive weight gain, and being stripped of his boxing licence. Fury regained his boxing license and was cleared to fight again in December 2017 and began training for his comeback around the same time.

Meanwhile, Wilder had now made six successful defences of his crown including his first-round knockout in a rematch with Stiverne, while the seventh defence was to be a career best win over unbeaten top contender Luis Ortiz in March 2018 via a tenth-round knockout. Post fight, on both occasions Wilder called out Anthony Joshua, who had since become champion by collecting the IBF and WBA titles, which had been vacated by Fury, in fights against Charles Martin and Klitschko, with Wilder stating his desire to unify the titles saying, "The world wants Wilder and Joshua, I want Joshua! Joshua, come and see me baby, no more hiding, no more ducking, no more dodging, no more excuses, let's make the fight happen and let's see who's the best, I know I'm the best, are you up for the test?" Later that month, Joshua defeated previously unbeaten Joseph Parker via unanimous decision in a unification bout which saw him add the WBO title to his name. However, after several months of ultimately fruitless negotiations with Joshua's promoter Eddie Hearn, Wilder and manager Shelly Finkel were left to look elsewhere with Joshua instead opting to make a defence against Povetkin which would take place on September 22, whilst Fury made his return to action on June 9 after a two and a half year hiatus since his win over Klitschko, stopping Sefer Seferi in four rounds.

On June 27, 2018, Fury gave Wilder a message in an Instagram video saying, "I'll apologise on behalf of Eddie Hearn and Anthony Joshua because they're from the same country as I am, they won't fight you and they've took three months stringing you and the fans along with no intention of fighting, but I'll fight you in three seconds. Get your boss to send me the contract and I'll show you how long it takes to sign it! If you wanna fight the best this country has ever had knock on my door and see if the Gypsy King doesn't answer! The ball is in your court." Around this time, Fury and Wilder discussed a potential fight privately, and their two teams began talks for a fight to take place before the end of the year.

== Build-up ==
By August 2018, both Wilder and Fury had agreed to a fight and, with Fury scheduled for the second fight of his comeback against former world title challenger Francesco Pianeta on 18 August on the undercard of Carl Frampton vs. Luke Jackson at Windsor Park in Belfast, Wilder was ringside to begin the promotion of the fight with Fury. After a comfortable points victory over Pianeta, there was a second in-ring confrontation between the two with Wilder saying, "We're ready now, this fight will happen, it's on baby, this is what we've been waiting for right here, the best fighting the best!" While Fury said, "we are two men who will fight anybody, this man has been trying to make a big fight with the other chump, I think we all know who we're talking about. But listen they called, I answered, I said send the contract, they sent it and I said yes." Wilder replied by saying, "There's one thing Tyson Fury has never had and that's the WBC belt, and if he ever thinks about having it he better wake up and apologise to me because he ain't never having it." The pair posed for photographs and then had a face off, with Fury's promoter Frank Warren stating that the fight was on, with only an announcement on a date and venue in the U.S. to be finalised.

On September 27, the fight was officially announced to be held on December 1, with the venue the Staples Center in Los Angeles, which won the rights ahead of venues in both Las Vegas and New York. A three-city press tour was also announced. The press conferences were in the following three cities:

- October 1, 2018 – BT Sport Headquarters, London
- October 2, 2018 – Flight Deck at Intrepid Sea, Air & Space Museum Complex, New York City
- October 3, 2018 – Star Plaza, Los Angeles, California

== Weigh in ==
The weigh in took place on November 30, on a made platform outside the Los Angeles Convention Center. Fury stepped on the scale first and weighed in at 256½ pounds, his lightest since his comeback following his lay off. The weight was only 2 pounds less than he weighed in August 2018 against Francisco Pianeta, but he looked leaner. Wilder was next to step on and came in at 212½ pounds, his lowest since his debut in 2008 when he weighed 207¼ pounds. For his last bout, Wilder weighed 214 pounds, however it was cited that Wilder suffered from an illness during his training camp.

For his unified light middleweight title on the undercard, Jarrett Hurd weighed 152½ pounds and his opponent Jason Welborn also came in at 152½ pounds. The remaining two televised cards were Joe Joyce vs. Joe Hanks and Luis Ortiz vs. Travis Kauffman. As both were heavyweight bouts, the boxers did not need to make weight. Joyce weighed 262 pounds compared to Hanks' 247½ pounds. Ortiz stepped on the scales at 241 pounds and Kauffman weighed 229 pounds.

== Fight details ==
In front of a crowd of 17,698 at the Staples Center, Wilder and Fury fought a 12-round split decision draw, meaning Wilder retained his WBC title. Mexican judge Alejandro Rochin scored the fight 115–111 for Wilder, Canadian judge Robert Tapper had it 114–112 for Fury and British judge Phil Edwards scored it a 113–113 draw.

The crowd booed at the decision. Fury, using his unorthodox stance, spent much of the fight using upper and lower-body movement to avoid Wilder's big shots and stay out of range. There was not much action in round 1 as both boxers used the round to feel each other out, with Wilder attempting to trap Fury into the corner, and Fury being able to evade most of Wilder's swings. In round 4, Wilder landed multiple stiff jabs, which caused Fury's nose to bleed. In round 6, Fury switched to southpaw stance and attempted to assert himself more in the fight, successfully backing Wilder against the ropes and at the same time stayed cautious of Wilder's power. Round 7 saw both fighters trading jabs, after which Fury landed a counter right hand, which quickly tied Wilder up before he could throw anything back. Round 8 saw back and forth action with both trying to land. In round 9, Wilder dropped Fury with a short left hook followed by an overhand right, which was the result of Fury's ducking low to avoid the left hook and being pushed further down by the right to the top of the head. Fury beat referee Jack Reiss’ count and survived the round. Rounds 10 and 11 saw Fury gaining the upper hand, as he landed two right hands, and then proceeded to land additional blows while managing to avoid any powerful swings that Wilder launched at him. In round 12, Wilder connected a right-left combination which put Fury down hard on his back. The crowd, commentary team and Wilder believed the fight was over. Reiss looked at Fury on the canvas and began giving him a count. To everyone's surprise, Fury beat the count. Reiss made Fury dance to his left to check if he was compos mentis, which he was, and Reiss called for the action to continue. Wilder was unable to land another power shot and Fury landed some right hands to finish the round and the fight on his feet. Both boxers embraced in a hug after the final bell sounded.

According to CompuBox statistics, Wilder landed 71 punches of 430 thrown (17%), and Fury landed 84 of his 327 thrown (26%). Wilder was much less accurate in this fight than he usually had been in previous fights. Fury out-landed Wilder in 9 out of the 12 rounds. Both Wilder and Fury only landed double digits in 4 separate rounds.

The fight ended in a split draw, with the scorecards at 115–111 for Wilder, 114–112 for Fury (which was incorrectly announced as 114–110), and 113–113. Wilder retained his WBC world title. Former boxers, commentators and pundits have since said that Fury was robbed in the decision of the fight.

=== Main event scorecards ===
California State Athletic Commission Official score card
Title: Deontay Wilder vs. Tyson Fury					Referee: Jack Reiss					Supervisor:				
Date: December 1, 2018					Venue: Staples Center					Promoter: Frank Warren, Tom Brown & Lou DiBella				
Wilder		vs.	Fury		Wilder		vs.	Fury		Wilder		vs.	Fury	
RS	TS	Rd	TS	RS	RS	TS	Rd	TS	RS	RS	TS	Rd	TS	RS
10		1		9	10		1		9	10		1		9
9	19	2	19	10	9	19	2	19	10	10	20	2	18	9
9	28	3	29	10	9	28	3	29	10	10	30	3	27	9
9	37	4	39	10	9	37	4	39	10	10	40	4	36	9
9	46	5	49	10	9	46	5	49	10	9	49	5	46	10
10	56	6	58	9	9	55	6	59	10	9	58	6	56	10
10	66	7	67	9	10	65	7	68	9	9	67	7	66	10
9	75	8	77	10	9	74	8	78	10	10	77	8	75	9
10	85	9	85	8	10	84	9	86	8	10	87	9	83	8
9	94	10	95	10	9	93	10	96	10	9	96	10	93	10
9	103	11	105	10	9	102	11	106	10	9	105	11	103	10
10	113	12	113	8	10	112	12	114	8	10	115	12	111	8
FINAL SCORE	113	–	113	FINAL SCORE	FINAL SCORE	112	–	114	FINAL SCORE	FINAL SCORE	115	–	111	FINAL SCORE
Draw			Draw		Lost			Won		Won			Lost	
Judge: Phil Edwards					Judge: Robert Tapper					Judge: Alejandro Rochin				
Suspensions: None					Point deductions: None					Decision: Split Draw				

== Aftermath ==
=== Post-fight remarks ===
Wilder and Fury embraced each other after the fight. Both Wilder and Fury stood in the ring after the fight and gave interviews to Jim Gray. Wilder felt he had done enough to win the fight, stating, "I think with the two knockdowns, I definitely won the fight. We poured our hearts out tonight. We're both warriors, but with those two drops, I think I won the fight. I came out slow. I rushed my punches. I didn't sit still. I was too hesitant. I started overthrowing the right hand, and I just couldn't adjust. I was rushing my punches. That's something I usually don't do. I couldn't let it go tonight. I was forcing my punches too much instead of sitting back, being patient and waiting it. I really wanted to get him out of there, give the fans what they want to see."

Fury said, "We're on away soil. I got knocked down twice, but I still believe I won that fight. I'm being a total professional here. I went to Germany to fight Klitschko, and I went to America to fight Deontay Wilder. God bless America. The 'Gypsy King' has returned. That man is a fearsome puncher, and I was able to avoid that. The world knows I won the fight. I hope I did you all proud after nearly three years out of the ring. I showed good heart to get up. I came here tonight, and I fought my heart out."

Wilder and Fury both claimed to be the best heavyweights in the world and both called out unified world champion Anthony Joshua. Fury shouted, “Chicken! Chicken! Joshua, where are you?” Wilder then agreed stating the two best heavyweights got into the ring and fought.

A few days after the fight, Wilder claimed that nine out of ten referees would have stopped the contest immediately after the 12th round knockdown. Speaking to SiriusXM Boxing, referee Jack Reiss explained why he did not stop the fight,

"I was evaluating these guys throughout the whole fight (and) in the 12th round, they'd boxed their hearts out, threw a lot of punches but there wasn't a lot of heavy damage taken by either guy.

They both moved into the 12th round tired but not extremely hurt. When (Fury) got hit and he went down hard, that was an unbelievable knockdown. Two things went through my mind - No 1 always count a champion out and No 2 give this guy the benefit of the doubt and let's see how he still is. So when I went down to count... not only did I get down, I scooted in so he could see my hand and hear my voice.

I said three, four... he was grimacing, his eyes and his cheeks, he was grimacing so I knew he was awake and then when I said five his eyes popped open like I startled him. He rolled over and got up and said "I'm OK! Jack I'm OK" or whatever he said. I said, 'Do you want to continue?', he said 'Yes' and put his arms on my shoulders. I pushed his arms off and said walk over there, come back to me and show me you're OK. He did and we let it go.

It is the referee's opportunity to make sure the fighter who is hurt can intelligently defend himself because you're about let a guy come hurtling across the ring and finish this guy. People started making them walk in a straight line, any drunk can walk in straight line. Doctors taught us it is hard to hide things are off when they have to change direction. That's what I was doing."

=== Rematches ===
==== Second fight ====
A week after the fight took place, promoter Frank Warren started talks for the rematch. The WBC also agreed to sanction a rematch if terms were agreed upon. According to Warren, negotiations were looking to be finalized in January 2019, with Warren and Fury calling for the rematch to take place in the U.K.

In December 2019, it was officially announced that a rematch had been scheduled for February 22, 2020, in Las Vegas. The rematch was far less competitive than the first fight, with Fury putting on a dominant performance, knocking Wilder to the floor twice en route to seventh-round stoppage after Wilder's corner threw in the towel to save Wilder from further punishment.

==== Trilogy fight ====
Weeks after the second fight, Wilder initiated a contractual rematch clause in March, with the bout initially being scheduled for July 18. However, due to Wilder still recovering from surgery and concerns over the COVID-19 pandemic, the bout was postponed to October. The date was again pushed back to December, and following a suggestion by Wilder's team to push the date back further, Fury announced that he was moving on from a third fight. Wilder initiated legal proceedings, claiming that Fury had broken their contract. In the meantime, Fury entered negotiations with Anthony Joshua for an undisputed heavyweight championship fight.

Following months of negotiations between the promoters of Fury and Joshua, an official announcement was said to be imminent. However, on May 17, 2021, it was announced that an arbitration judge had ruled in Wilder's favor, ordering Fury to face Wilder no later than September 15.

Following the decision, Fury's co-promoter, Bob Arum, revealed a targeted date of July 24, at T-Mobile Arena in Las Vegas. The fight was postponed after Fury tested positive for COVID-19 in July, with the bout being rescheduled for October 9.

== Fight card ==
Weight Class		vs.		Method	Round	Time	Notes
Heavyweight	(United States) Deontay Wilder (c)	vs.	(United Kingdom) Tyson Fury	SD	12/12		^{Note 1}
Light middleweight	(United States) Jarrett Hurd (c)	def.	(United Kingdom) Jason Welborn	KO	4/12	1:06	^{Note 2}
Heavyweight	(Cuba) Luis Ortiz	def.	(United States) Travis Kauffman	TKO	10/10	1:01
Heavyweight	(United Kingdom) Joe Joyce	def.	(United States) Joe Hanks	KO	1/10	2:25	^{Note 3}
Strawweight	(United States) Carlos Licona	def.	(Philippines) Mark Anthony Barriga	SD	12/12		^{Note 4}
Featherweight	(United Kingdom) Isaac Lowe	def.	(Argentina) Lucas Rafael Baez	TKO	5/10		^{Note 5}
Middleweight	(United States) Julian Williams	def.	(Mexico) Francisco Javier Castro	TKO	2/8
Heavyweight	(United States) Chris Arreola	def.	(United States) Maurenzo Smith	RTD	6/8
Welterweight	(United States) Robert Guerrero	def.	(Hungary) Adam Mate	TKO	2/8
Super flyweight	(United States) Jesse Rodriguez	def.	(United States) Josue Morales	UD	6
Cruiserweight	(United States) Marsellos Wilder	def.	(United States) David Damore	UD	4

^Note 1 For WBC heavyweight title.
^Note 2 For IBF, WBA (Super) and IBO light middleweight titles.
^Note 3 For vacant WBA Continental (Europe) heavyweight title.
^Note 4 For vacant IBF minimumweight title.
^Note 5 For vacant WBC International featherweight title.

=== Purses ===
According to the California State Athletic Commission, Wilder had a guaranteed base purse of $4 million and Fury took home a guaranteed purse of $3 million. Despite Frank Warren's original claim that the revenue would be split 50-50, it was revealed that if the fight generated 1 million PPV buys, Wilder could make $14 million (£11 million) and Fury would earn around $10.25 million (£8 million). Both boxers would see this increase to their base purses after receiving their percentages from pay-per-view revenue.

Guaranteed base purses

- Deontay Wilder ($4 million) vs. Tyson Fury ($3 million)
- Jarrett Hurd ($1 million) vs. Jason Welborn ($30,000)
- Luis Ortiz ($375,000) vs. Travis Kauffman ($125,000)
- Joe Joyce ($40,000) vs. Joe Hanks ($50,000)
- Carlos Licona ($30,000) vs. Mark Anthony Barriga ($25,000)
- Isaac Lowe ($5,000) vs. Lucas Rafael Baez ($2,500)
- Julian Williams ($30,000) vs. Francisco Javier Castro ($2,500)
- Chris Arreola ($25,000) vs. Maurenzo Smith ($16,000)
- Robert Guerrero ($25,000) vs. Adam Mate ($2,500)
- Jessie Rodriguez ($7,000) vs. Josue Morales ($6,000)
- Marsellos Wilder ($10,000) vs. David Damore ($2,500)

== Viewership ==
The fight was shown live on Showtime PPV in the United States and on BT Sport Box Office in the United Kingdom. It was the first boxing pay-per-view event headlined by heavyweights on US TV since Hasim Rahman vs. Oleg Maskaev II in 2006, and the first heavyweight fight to be PPV in both the US and UK since Lennox Lewis fought Mike Tyson in 2002.

The event was both a critical and a commercial success. At $74.99 in HD, the fight generated 325,000 buys in the United States. In the United Kingdom, the fight sold 450,000 buys. Showtime's delayed broadcast a week later drew an average 488,000 viewers, peaking at 590,000, in the United States.

According to UK-based anti-piracy company Muso, the fight was watched illegally online by nearly 10 million viewers worldwide via pirated streams, including 1.9 million in the United States and more than 1 million in the United Kingdom.

=== Broadcasting ===
Country	Broadcasters			
Country	Free-to-air	Cable/pay television	PPV	Stream
United States (host)	—N/a		Showtime	
United Kingdom	—N/a		BT Sport Box Office	—N/a
Ireland	—N/a		BT Sport Box Office	—N/a
Australia	—N/a		Main Event	—N/a
Austria	—N/a			DAZN
Germany	—N/a			DAZN
Italy	—N/a			DAZN
Switzerland	—N/a			DAZN
France	—N/a	Canal+ Sport	—N/a	My Canal
Monaco	—N/a	Canal+ Sport	—N/a	My Canal
Greece	—N/a	Cosmote Sport	—N/a	Cosmote GO
Israel	—N/a	Sport 1	—N/a	Sport 1
Japan	—N/a	Wowow	—N/a	Wowow
Latin America: Argentina; Bolivia; Brazil; Chile; Colombia; Ecuador; Mexico; Paraguay; Peru; Uruguay; Venezuela	—N/a	Fox Sports	—N/a	Fox Sports Play
New Zealand	—N/a		Sky Arena	—N/a
Nordic countries: Denmark; Finland; Norway; Sweden	—N/a		Viaplay	
Panamá	Telemetro	—N/a		Medcom Go
Poland	—N/a	Canal+ Sport	—N/a	NC+ Go
Russia	Match TV			
Sub-Saharan Africa	—N/a	SuperSport	—N/a	DStv Now
Turkey	DMAX	—N/a		DMAX

== See also ==
- Deontay Wilder vs. Tyson Fury II
- Tyson Fury vs. Deontay Wilder III

Preceded by vs. Luis Ortiz	Deontay Wilder's bouts 1 December 2018	Succeeded by vs. Dominic Breazeale
Preceded by vs. Francesco Pianeta	Tyson Fury's bouts 1 December 2018	Succeeded by vs. Tom Schwarz
Awards
Preceded by Dominic Breazeale vs. Izu Ugonoh; Round 3	The Ring Round of the Year; Round 12; 2018	Succeeded by Anthony Joshua vs. Andy Ruiz Jr. Round 3
