= Deontay Wilder vs. Luis Ortiz =

Boxing competitions

- Date: March 3, 2018
- Venue: Barclays Center, New York, U.S
- Title(s) on the line: WBC Heavyweight Championship

Tale of the tape
Boxer	Deontay Wilder	Luis Ortiz
Nickname	The Bronze Bomber	King Kong
Hometown	Tuscaloosa, Alabama, U.S	Camaguey, Cuba
Purse	$2,100,000	$500,000
Pre-fight record	39–0 (38 KO)	28–0 (24 KO)
Age	32 years, 4 months	38 years, 11 months
Height	6 ft 7 in (201 cm)	6 ft 4 in (193 cm)
Weight	214 lb (97 kg)	241 lb (109 kg)
Style	Orthodox	Southpaw
Recognition	WBC; Heavyweight Champion; The Ring/TBRB; No. 2 Ranked Heavyweight	WBC; No. 3 Ranked Heavyweight; The Ring; No. 5 Ranked Heavyweight

Result
- Wilder defeats Ortiz in the 10th round via TKO

Deontay Wilder vs. Luis Ortiz was a professional boxing match contested on March 3, 2018, for the WBC Heavyweight Championship.

== Background ==
Wilder had first become WBC heavyweight champion in January 2015, after he defeated Bermane Stiverne via 12 round unanimous decision at the MGM Grand in Las Vegas. Stiverne had been making the first defence of the crown he had claimed after he beat Chris Arreola for the title that had been vacated by the retiring Vitali Klitschko. Wilder then saw off a host of challengers that included Eric Molina, Johann Duhaupas and Artur Szpilka before he was due to make a mandatory defence of his title against Alexander Povetkin in May 2016. However less than two weeks before the fight was due to take place Povetkin failed a drug test which meant the contest was called off altogether. Two months later Wilder fought replacement opponent Arreola and retired him in his corner after 8 rounds. A hand injury then kept Wilder out until February 2017 when he fought fellow undefeated American Gerald Washington, knocking him out in the 5th round.

Meanwhile, the relatively unknown but well schooled and dangerous Ortiz had so far been unable to secure a title shot despite his high rankings. His 'high risk, low reward' factor meant that he was largely avoided by the divisions top fighters, but he had previously knocked out contenders Bryant Jennings and Tony Thompson before a short term deal in November 2016 saw him fight twice in two months and in Europe for the first time, first facing Malik Scott in Monaco. Scott was extremely negative and reluctant to engage throughout the contest and Ortiz was forced to go the full distance for the first time in his career, winning every round of a 12 round unanimous decision. He then faced the highly durable Dave Allen in Manchester and stopped him on his feet after 7 one sided rounds.

In July 2017, it was reported that a deal was being worked out which would see Wilder defend his title against Ortiz on 4 November. Wilder's mandatory challenger Stiverne had accepted step aside money and agreed to face Dominic Breazeale on the undercard. On 29 September, Ortiz failed a drug test after he tested positive for the banned diuretics chlorothiazide and hydrochlorothiazide, which Ortiz claimed was because he was on medication to treat high blood pressure. The arranged fight was cancelled and Wilder faced Stiverne in a rematch instead, knocking him down three times on the way to delivering a sensational 1st round knockout. This meant Wilder had now stopped every opponent he had faced, the first fight with Stiverne being the only time he had been taken the distance in his career to date.

On December 8, 2017, Wilder was ringside when Ortiz made his return to action and knocked out Daniel Martz in the 2nd round. After the fight, Ortiz called out Wilder in his post fight interview before Wilder joined him in the ring to reply, "I'm going to give you another chance, I want to fight the best and I think you're one of the best, so I guarantee you you'll have the fight." Fresh negotiations for the fight to be rescheduled then began and by January 12, 2018 terms had been agreed for the fight to take place on March 3 at the Barclays Center in New York. The contest would be 32 year old Wilder's seventh defence of his crown and the 38 year old Ortiz's first shot at a world title. Both fighters went into the fight unbeaten as professionals and both were also widely regarded to be the toughest opponent of each fighter's career thus far. Wilder was to earn a career-high $2.1 million for the fight and Ortiz would receive a $500,000 purse.

== The fight ==
The fight had a fairly cagey start as both men tried to work behind their jab with the more active and aggressive Ortiz getting the better of the first 4 rounds. The fight took a twist at the end of the 5th round as Wilder landed a powerful right hand on Ortiz' forehead that made the challenger stumble before Wilder caught him with a second right hand to the temple that sent Ortiz backwards into the ropes and on to the floor. Ortiz got to his feet and beat the count only for the bell to ring before any more punches could be thrown. Wilder began to find the target more in the 6th and he caught Ortiz with a right hand in the 7th but was clipped himself by counter right hook from Ortiz that stunned Wilder as Ortiz followed it up with a hard left hook, then began to unload and land hard shots to both head and body including a couple of big straight left hands that left the champion shaken and hanging on before the bell sounded to signal the end of the round.

At the start of the 8th round Wilder's corner signalled to the referee to call time out to inspect Wilder's face giving him around an extra 20 seconds of recovery time despite there being no obvious cut or injury. Ortiz then tried to press home his advantage stalking Wilder as the champion looked for counters whilst regaining his composure. In the 9th Wilder made better use of his range and jab and towards the end of the round pushed Ortiz back with right hand before rushing in and nearly getting caught by a counter left hand by Ortiz which in turn blocked another right hand from Wilder. The entertaining contest took another turn mid way through the 10th round as both men exchanged blows with left hand by Ortiz and a right hook from Wilder that forced both men to grab each other with Ortiz being thrown to the ground by Wilder. The referee signalled no knockdown before Wilder unleashed a barrage of punches in a slightly wild and unorthodox yet ruthless and clinical fashion, Ortiz stood his ground until a heavy right hand pierced his guard and wobbled him before a second sent him down to the canvas on his knees. Ortiz managed to regain his feet for a second time but in the following exchange was immediately caught by another hard right hand from Wilder that staggered him, before the champion again unloaded another flurry of punches with a right uppercut finally putting Ortiz down for the third and final time in the fight as the referee stepped in to wave the contest off.

== Aftermath ==
It was revealed that all three official ringside judges had Wilder ahead 85–84 at the time of the stoppage, whilst both Showtime and CBS Sports had it 86–83 in favour of Ortiz. Wilder gave his thoughts on the contest saying, "A true champion always finds a way to come back, and that's what I did tonight. Luis Ortiz is definitely a crafty guy. He put up a great fight. We knew we had to wear him down. I showed everyone I can take a punch. When Ortiz leaves tonight, he can hold his head high. He gave the fans a hell of a fight." Wilder also added, "He was hitting me with those furious punches, throwing combos that knocked me off balance. I just had to get my range back and my fundamentals back and I was able to do that. I showed I was a true champion tonight. Ortiz was one of those fighters that everyone ducked, even champions ducked him," Wilder said. "I wondered why it took so long for him to get a title shot and now we know."

Speaking through a translator Ortiz also gave a post fight interview saying, "I almost had him, and I think I would've if there were a few more seconds in the round, Wilder was definitely saved by the bell. I thought I had him out on his feet. But you have to give him credit, he weathered the storm." He also added, "I feel fine, I did receive a right hand, but I'm OK. I was listening to the directions that my corner was giving me. In this sport, any punch can end a fight, in the ring anything can happen. I thought I was going to get a rhythm earlier but I thought I was winning the fight. This is heavyweight boxing and he caught me with a great shot. It was a great fight and he's a great champion." When questioned about facing the winner of the upcoming unification clash between Anthony Joshua and Joseph Parker, Wilder reiterated his desire for a unification fight of his own when he added, "I'm ready right now. I always said that I want to unify, I'm ready whenever those guys are. I solidified my position at the top of the food chain tonight."

== Undercard ==
Confirmed bouts:

== Broadcasting ==
The fight was aired live on Showtime in the United States, live on Sky Sports in the United Kingdom; live on tvOne and iflix in Indonesia; live on beIN Sports in France and Asia-Pacific; and live on Fox Sports in Australia. The fight averaged 1.1 million viewers and peaked at 1.2 million on Showtime. The last time Showtime had done over 1 million viewers was in 2015 when Wilder had first defeated Stiverne for the WBC title.

Country	Broadcaster
Australia	Fox Sports
France	beIN Sports
Indonesia	tvOne/iflix
Russia	Match TV
United Kingdom	Sky Sports
United States	Showtime

== See also ==
- Deontay Wilder vs. Luis Ortiz II

Preceded by vs. Bermane Stiverne	Deontay Wilder's bouts March 3, 2018	Succeeded by vs. Tyson Fury
Preceded by vs. Daniel Martz	Luis Ortiz's bouts March 3, 2018	Succeeded by vs. Răzvan Cojanu
