= Bartow Arena =

Arena in Birmingham, Alabama

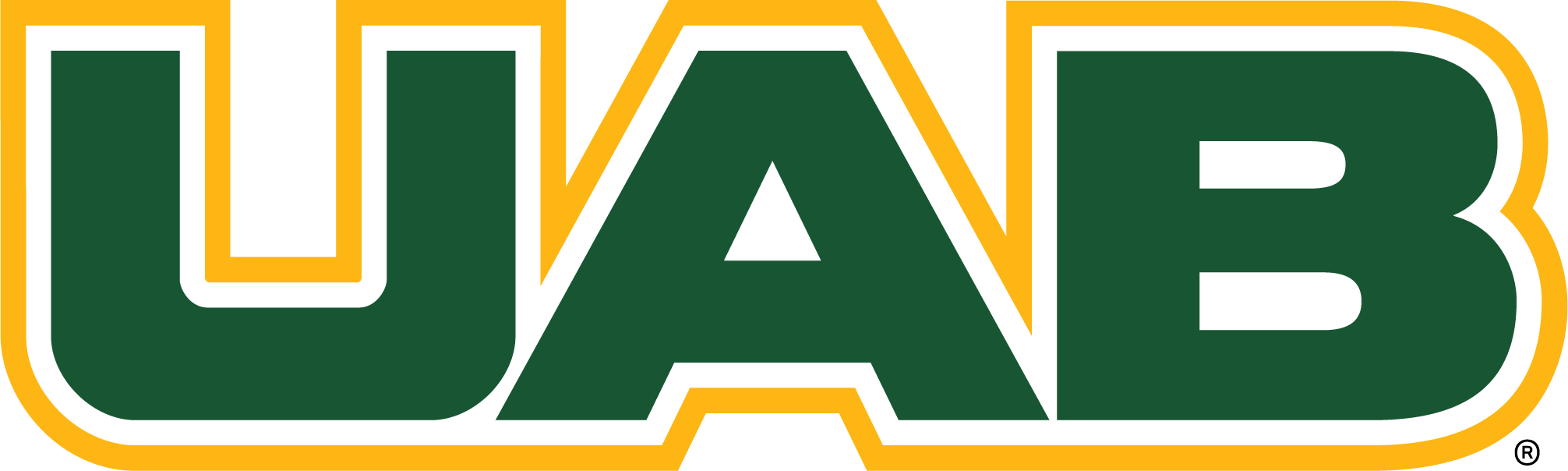

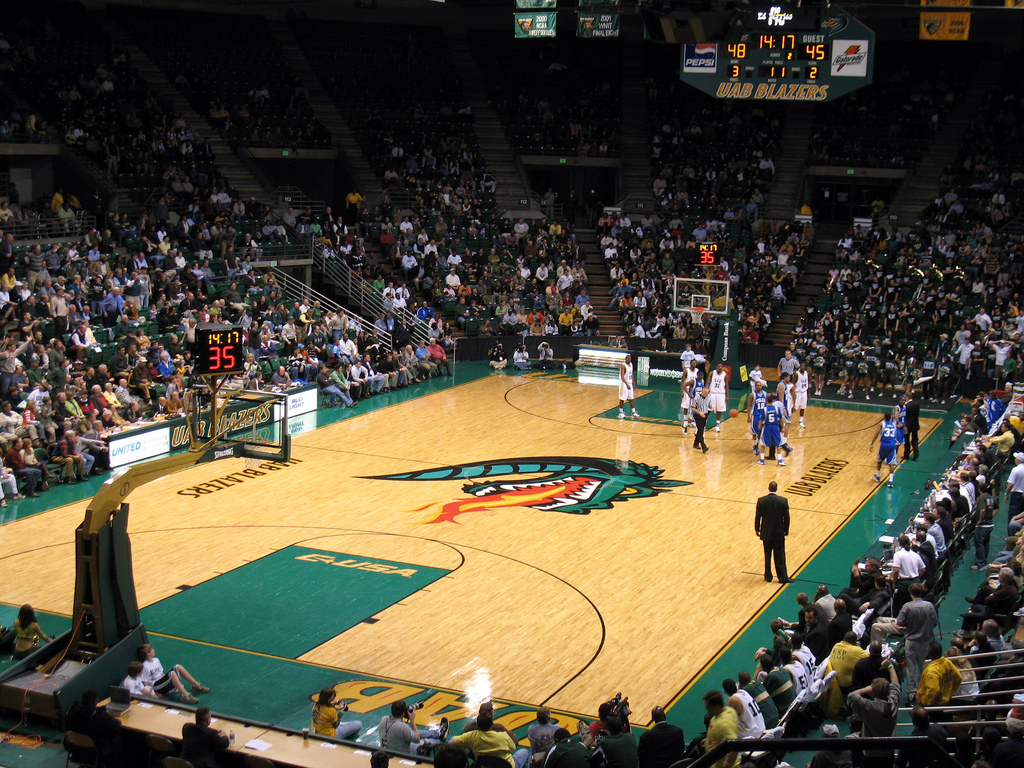
- UAB Blazers Men's Basketball vs. Tulsa
- Interactive map of Bartow Arena
- Former names: UAB Arena (1988–1997)
- Location: 617 13th Street South; Birmingham, Alabama, U.S.
- Coordinates: 33°30′7.79″N 86°48′33.28″W
- Owner: University of Alabama at Birmingham
- Operator: University of Alabama at Birmingham
- Capacity: 8,508
- Record attendance: 9,878 (August 16, 2015, BGEA Greater Birmingham Festival of Hope)

Construction
- Groundbreaking: 1986
- Opened: December 3, 1988
- Cost: $10.6 million ($28.9 million in 2025 dollars)
- Architect: GA Architecture Studio
- Services engineers: MW/Davis Dumas & Associates, Inc.
- General contractor: Huber, Hunt & Nichols

Tenant
- UAB Blazers Athletics

Website
- uab.edu/bartow-arena

Bartow Arena is an 8,508-seat multi-purpose arena in Birmingham, in the U.S. state of Alabama. It is home to the University of Alabama at Birmingham (UAB) Blazers men's and women's basketball teams as well as the women's volleyball team. The arena is named after Gene Bartow, the coach who built the school's men's basketball program from scratch over the last quarter of the 20th century. UAB initially played their games at the Birmingham–Jefferson Convention Complex Arena, now known as Legacy Arena, but moved its games to the on-campus facility beginning with the 1988–89 season.

== History ==
Between 1978 and 1988, the Blazers played their home games at the off-campus Birmingham–Jefferson Convention Complex Arena, located just north of downtown Birmingham. On December 3, 1988, the men's team defeated Vanderbilt 76–69 in the first game played at the then named UAB Arena. Following the retirement of Gene Bartow in December 1996, the University of Alabama Board of Trustees voted to officially change the name of UAB Arena to Bartow Arena. Its rededication as Bartow Arena occurred on January 25, 1997, with the Blazers defeating rival Memphis 51–48.

Currently playing as a member of the American Conference, UAB has won more than 80 percent of its games played there. The record attendance for Bartow Arena was set on February 16, 2008, against Memphis with an announced crowd of 9,392. At the conclusion of the 2010–11 season, the UAB men's team has an all-time record of 277 victories and 59 losses at Bartow, giving the program an all-time winning percentage of .824.

== Attendance records ==
Top 10 Home Basketball Games at Bartow Arena
	Opponent	Attendance
1	Memphis (2008)	9,392
2	Louisville (2005)	9,354
3	Cincinnati (2004)	9,312
4	Cincinnati (2000)	9,279
5	Cincinnati (1996)	9,213
6	Memphis (2009)	9,153
7	Memphis (2011)	9,119
8	Alcorn State (1989)	9,010
9	Arkansas (1990)	8,951
10	Cincinnati (1994)	8,907

== Venue Events ==
Bartow Arena serves as primary home to the UAB men's and women's basketball teams as well as women's volleyball. In addition, Bartow Arena has served as home to UAB graduation ceremonies and a number of other UAB sponsored concerts and activities.

In 1996, Bartow Arena served as host to the CUSA Women's Basketball Tournament. Additionally, the arena has been host to the early rounds of the CUSA Women's Basketball Tournament in 2015, 2016, and 2017.

In 2015, Bartow Arena hosted the World Heavyweight Boxing Championship between Deontay Wilder and Eric Molina.

== Gallery ==
Bartow Arena
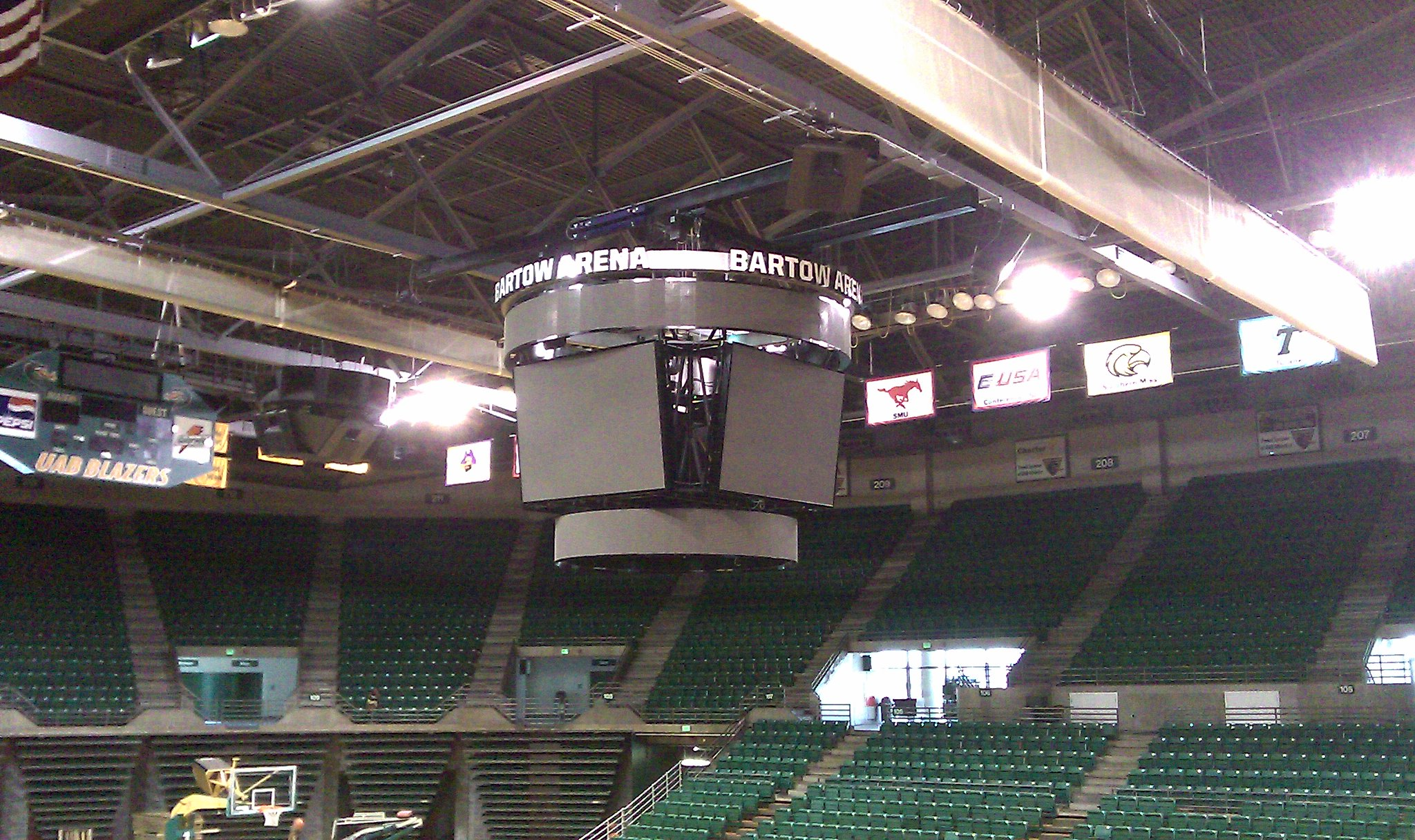
Bartow Arena center scoreboard installed in Fall 2009.

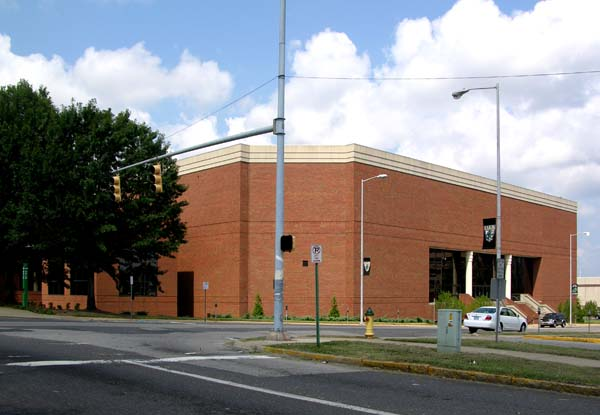
Exterior of Bartow from the southeast.

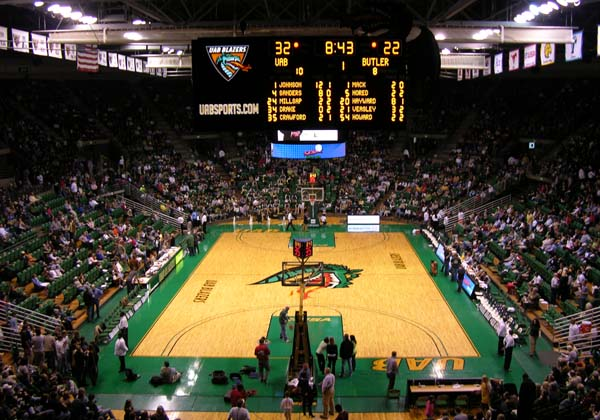
Interior of Bartow during a timeout against Butler in December 2009.

== See also ==
- List of NCAA Division I basketball arenas
