= Deontay Wilder =

American boxer (born 1985)

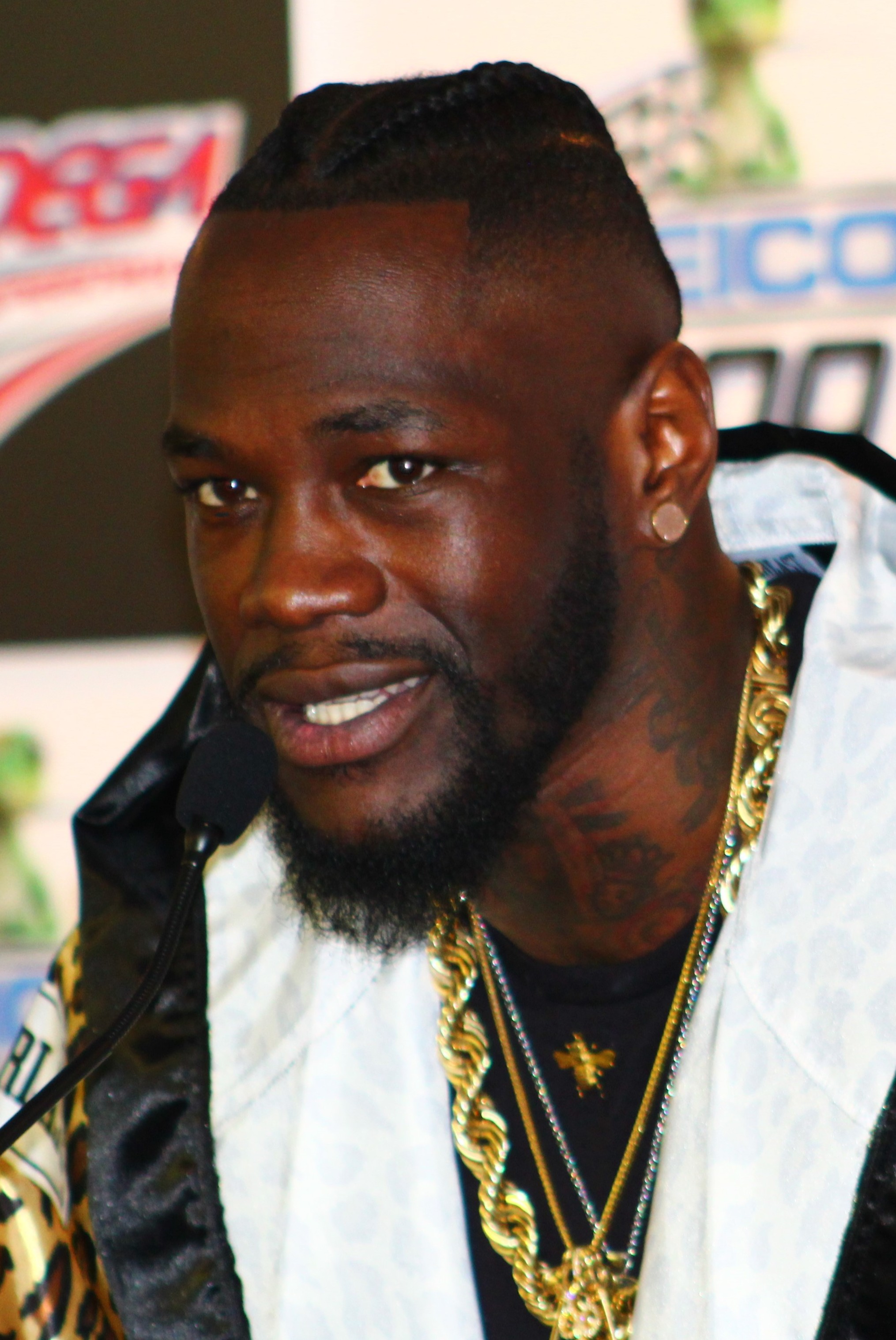
- Wilder in 2018

Personal information
- Nicknames: The Bronze Bomber; Dr. Sleep
- Born: Deontay Leshun Wilder; October 22, 1985 (age 41) Tuscaloosa, Alabama, U.S.
- Height: 6 ft 7 in (201 cm)
- Weight: Heavyweight

Boxing career
- Reach: 83 in (211 cm)
- Stance: Orthodox

Boxing record
- Total fights: 50
- Wins: 45
- Win by KO: 43
- Losses: 4
- Draws: 1
Medal record
Men's amateur boxing
Representing United States
Olympic Games
Bronze medal – third place	2008 Beijing	Heavyweight
Golden Gloves
Gold medal – first place	2007 Chattanooga	Heavyweight
U.S. National Championships
Gold medal – first place	2007 Colorado Springs	Heavyweight

Deontay Leshun Wilder (/ˈwaɪldər/ WYLE-dər; born October 22, 1985) is an American professional boxer. He held the World Boxing Council (WBC) heavyweight title from 2015 to 2020. By winning the title, Wilder became the first American world heavyweight champion since 2007, which was the longest period of time in boxing history without an American heavyweight champion.

Wilder had a late start to boxing, taking up the sport at 20 years of age. As an amateur, he won a bronze medal in the heavyweight division at the 2008 Olympics. This led to his nickname of "the Bronze Bomber," which Wilder coined after Joe Louis, who was known by the nickname of "the Brown Bomber."

Wilder is known for his exceptional punching power, and has been described as one of the hardest punchers in boxing history. His knockout-to-win percentage stands at 95.55%, the highest in heavyweight championship history, with 20 of his knockouts (48%) in the first round. He is a three-time winner of the Premier Boxing Champions Knockout of the Year award (2016, 2017, 2019) and a winner of the Ring magazine Knockout of the Year award (2019).

== Early life ==
Wilder graduated from Tuscaloosa Central High School in 2004 and dreamed of playing football (wide receiver) or basketball (forward) for his hometown Alabama Crimson Tide, but the birth of his oldest daughter and poor grades caused him to attend nearby Shelton State Community College and to focus on a boxing career. Wilder later revealed that during this time, he struggled with depression and had briefly contemplated suicide via gunshot. When reflecting on the incident, he stated "You don't think about what effect it would cause for your family, your daughter, your kids and so forth and so on... In that state of mind, you just become selfish. You think of the inner pain and the outer pain that you're feeling right at that very moment in time."

== Amateur career ==
Wilder started boxing in October 2005, when he entered Skyy Boxing Gym in Northport, Alabama, and began training under Jay Deas. Wilder was 20 at that time.

By 2007, he upset the favorites to win both the National Golden Gloves and the U.S. championships at 201 lb (91 kg).

At the Golden Gloves, he defeated highly touted cadet world champion Isiah Thomas, a southpaw from Detroit, and David Thompson, of Brooklyn, in the finals. At the U.S. championship he defeated Quantis Graves and won the final 31–15 over southpaw James Zimmerman of San Jose, California.

At the Olympic trials, he beat Graves twice more and won the Olympic trials in only 21 bouts. Early in 2008 he scored a career-best win by edging out world championship silver medalist and future Olympic champion Rakhim Chakhiyev in Russia. He qualified for the Olympics by beating Deivis Julio 6:5 Jorge Quinones from Ecuador on double countback and Brazilian Rafael Lima 6:5 at the qualifier.

In a Russia-USA dual match on February 29, 2008, in Novosibirsk, Wilder was knocked out by Evgenyi Romanov.

Wilder then competed at heavyweight in the 2008 Olympics, defeating Abdelaziz Touilbini of Algeria and Mohamed Arjaoui of Morocco before losing to Clemente Russo of Italy in the semi-final to earn a bronze medal.

Wilder had an approximate amateur record of 30–5.

=== Olympic results ===
Boxing at the 2008 Summer Olympics:

- Defeated Abdelaziz Toulbini (Algeria) 10:4
- Defeated Mohamed Arjaoui (Morocco) 10+:10 (tiebreaker criteria)
- Lost to Clemente Russo (Italy) 1:7

=== World Championship results ===
2007 AIBA World Boxing Championships:

- Lost to Krzysztof Zimnoch (Poland) 20–23 (10/24/2007)

== Professional career ==
=== Early career ===
Wilder made his professional debut at the age of 23 on November 15, 2008, at the Vanderbilt University Memorial Gymnasium in Nashville, Tennessee. He faced Ethan Cox (2–2–1), winning by second-round technical knockout (TKO) after knocking Cox down three times. Wilder fought seven times in 2009, winning all the fights in round one. By October 2012, Wilder racked up a 25-fight win streak, winning all by knockout and all within four rounds. Some notable stoppages included former WBA heavyweight title challenger Owen Beck (27–10, 20 KOs), former WBO light heavyweight title challenger DeAndrey Abron (15–6, 10 KOs) and former WBO heavyweight challenger Damon Reed (46–15, 32 KOs).

Wilder won his first title in professional boxing when he knocked out 37-year-old Kelvin Price (13–0, 6 KOs) at the Memorial Sports Arena in Los Angeles, on December 15, 2012. The fight was originally slated to take place in August 2012. Wilder fought patiently through the first two rounds and mostly measured Price. The fight ended when a right hand from Wilder caught Price on the jaw and sent him back into the ropes and down. He attempted to get to his feet, but struggled which led referee Ray Corona to wave an end to the bout. Wilder claimed the vacant WBC Continental Americas heavyweight title, which he went on to successfully defend twice.

=== Rise up the ranks ===
On April 3, 2013, Golden Boy Promotions announced that Wilder would fight former European heavyweight champion and 2000 Olympic gold medalist Audley Harrison (31–6, 23 KOs) at the Motorpoint Arena in Sheffield, his UK debut, on April 27. Harrison was coming into this fight looking to rebuild after winning the prizefighter heavyweight tournament two months earlier. The card, which was being shown live on Showtime in USA, was headlined by Amir Khan's return in the UK against Julio Díaz. Harrison stated that he would retire if he lost. Wilder knocked out Harrison in round one. Wilder found an opening 49 seconds into the opening round and caught Harrison with a big right hand that rocked him back into the ropes. A follow-up barrage from Wilder sent Harrison into the corner, crumpling onto the floor. Harrison used the ropes to get to his feet at the count of eight, but referee Terry O'Connor called off the bout. The official time of stoppage was 1:22 of the first round. Four days after the fight, Harrison announced his retirement at the age of 41.

On May 9, Frank Warren announced a card that would take place at the Wembley Arena in London on June 15, 2013, which would feature Wilder and British boxer Derek Chisora as the main event. Prior to the announcement, Golden Boy and Wilder's camp stated there was no deal in place. The fight fell through after Wilder was arrested in May following a domestic assault in Las Vegas, Nevada. Days later, Wilder signed Al Haymon as his new advisor.

In June, Golden Boy announced Wilder would main event a triple header of a Showtime card at the Fantasy Springs Casino in Indio, California, against former WBO heavyweight champion Siarhei Liakhovich (25–5, 16 KOs) on August 9, 2013, in a ten-round bout. Liakhovich would fight for the first time in nearly a year and half. Wilder knocked Liakhovich out in the first round. Wilder caught Liakhovich with a big right hand; while Liakhovich was backed against the ropes, he went down heavily and began twitching. The referee waved an end to the bout without beginning a count. Liakhovich was kept down for some time in the ring, before being helped to a stool. Days after the fight, Liakhovich filed a protest to change the outcome as 'no contest' citing that Wilder hit him with illegal punches. Liakhovich claimed he was punched behind the ear and neck area.

Two months later in October, Wilder knocked out Nicolai Firtha (21–10–1, 8 KOs) in four rounds to maintain his knockout streak. Prior to the stoppage, Firtha was dropped twice in the opening round. In February 2014 it was announced that Wilder would fight 33-year-old Malik Scott (36–1–1, 13 KOs) in an eliminator for the WBC heavyweight title. The fight took place on the undercard of Garcia-Herrera at the Coliseo Ruben Rodriguez in Puerto Rico on March 15. When the fight was first announced, Wilder was #3 in the WBC ratings while Scott was #26. Wilder knocked out Scott at 1:36 of the first round. Wilder started off with slow jabs and the knockout blow appeared to be a straight right hand, which many believe did not connect clearly. There was an instant reaction from the crowd and on social media regarding how the fight ended. Scott was said to be unhappy about reports that he took a dive and congratulated Wilder. This set Wilder up as mandatory challenger for the WBC heavyweight title held by new champion Bermane Stiverne, who had defeated Chris Arreola for the title vacated by the retiring Vitali Klitschko.

In August 2014, Wilder fought journeyman and former Prizefighter finalist Jason Gavern (25–16–4, 11 KOs) in a 10-round bout. The fight took place at the StubHub Center in Carson, California, on the undercard of the IBF welterweight fight between Shawn Porter and Kell Brook fight. Gavern was knocked down in rounds three and four. His corner threw in the towel after round four giving Wilder another stoppage victory.

=== WBC heavyweight champion ===
==== Wilder vs. Stiverne ====
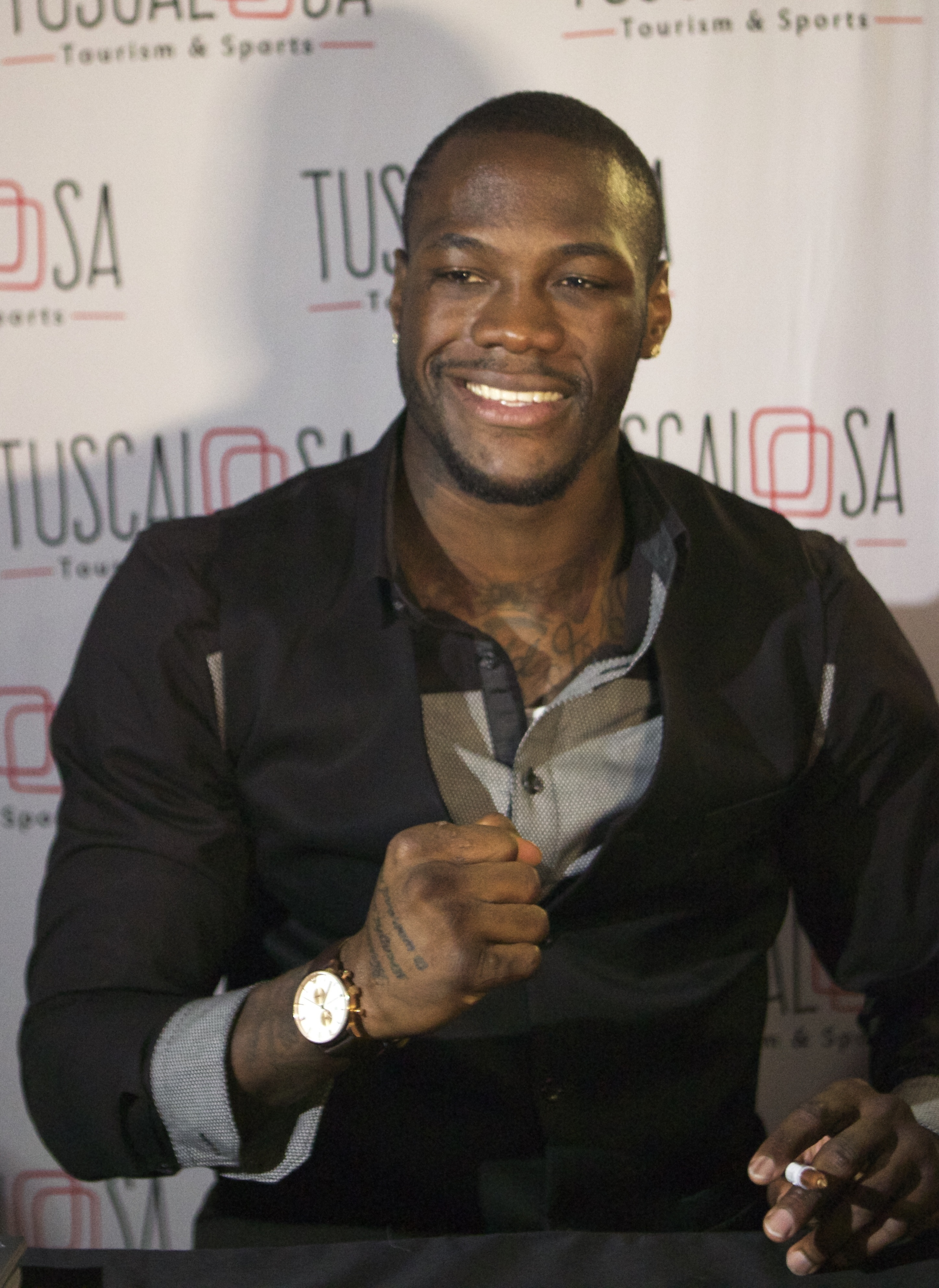
Wilder in 2015

On January 17, 2015, billed as "Return to Glory," Wilder fought Stiverne at the MGM Grand Garden Arena in Las Vegas, Nevada for the WBC heavyweight title. Wilder became the first American heavyweight world champion since Shannon Briggs by defeating Stiverne by a unanimous decision after twelve rounds. The judges scored it 118–109, 119–108, and 120–107. Stiverne landed 110 of 327 punches (34%) with Wilder landing 227 of 621 punches (37%). Wilder had some big rounds, particularly rounds two and seven, where he threw a barrage of power shots. Wilder showed that he could go twelve rounds and utilized his jab throughout. This was the first real proof to critics that Wilder could go the distance and could box, as up to that point he had finished all opponents inside the distance. After the fight, Wilder dedicated his win to his disabled daughter, and to his boxing hero Muhammad Ali, who had turned 73 years old that same day. The fight averaged 1.24 million viewers, peaking at 1.34 million on Showtime. According to the Nevada State Athletic Commission (NSAC), Wilder earned $1 million and Stiverne received $910,000. Shortly after the fight, Wilder cut his relationship with Golden Boy Promotions and Al Haymon became his new manager.

==== Wilder vs. Molina ====
On May 8, 2015, Wilder announced that he would make his first defense in his home state of Alabama, which would be the first heavyweight title fight held in the state. Wilder last fought in Alabama in 2012. Showtime confirmed they would televise the bout live on June 13 at Bartow Arena, Birmingham, Alabama. Shortly after, WBC #14 Eric Molina (23–2, 17 KOs) was announced as Wilder's opponent. After receiving some backlash for choosing Molina as his first defense, Wilder claimed there were other options, but their asking prices were too high. Molina was aiming to become the first Mexican-American world heavyweight champion in history. A sold-out crowd of 9,347 was announced. Wilder dominated, knocking down Molina near the end of round four, twice in the fifth, and knocking him out onto his back in the ninth round. Wilder showed respect for Molina after the bout, stating "I was really surprised he kept coming and hanging in there. A lot of people said he wouldn't even be around, he wouldn't last. There were a lot of doubters, but he showed a lot of heart, and I needed that kind of guy to fight here in Alabama." Wilder was ahead on all three judges' scorecards at the time of stoppage 90–77, 89–78, and 89–78. According to CompuBox Punch stats, Wilder landed 141 of 303 thrown (47%) whilst Molina landed just 49 of 188 (26%). The fight aired on Showtime and averaged 678,000 viewers. Wilder earned $1.4 million for the fight compared to Molina, who received a $250,000 purse.

==== Wilder vs. Duhaupas ====
In August 2015, it was announced that Wilder would make his second defense against WBC #12 Johann Duhaupas (32–2, 20 KOs) on September 26 at the Legacy Arena, Alabama. In front of a hometown crowd of 8,471 in attendance, Wilder beat Duhaupas by TKO in the eleventh round. Duhaupas, who was battered and bloodied, claimed he still had plenty of fight left when referee Jack Reiss waved off his brave challenge. Duhaupas had never been stopped before in his career inside the distance. It was a very one-sided fight — after taking punishment in round seven, referee Jack Reiss went over to Duhaupas' corner telling him he would need to do more or he would stop the fight. Wilder was ahead 100–90, 99–90, and 99–91 on judges' scorecards at the time of stoppage, having landed 326 of 587 punches thrown (56%) while Duhaupas landed 98 of 332 (30%). In the post fight, Wilder praised Duhaupas' toughness, saying "We knew he was tough. We knew he was mentally tough. We knew he was going to come. That's why you can't criticize nobody you don't know. The most scariest people are the ones you don't know." For the fight, Wilder made $1.4 million and Duhaupas earned a $140,000 purse. The fight was the main event of Premier Boxing Champions on NBC and averaged 2.2 million viewers, peaking at 3 million viewers.

==== Wilder vs. Szpilka ====
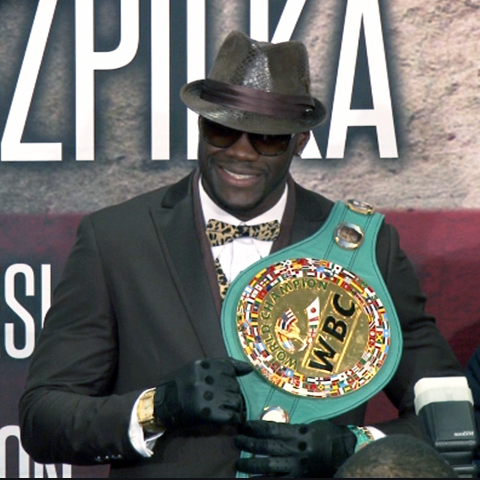
Deontay Wilder poses with the WBC Championship Belt.

In December 2015, Showtime confirmed that terms had been agreed for Wilder to defend his WBC title on January 16, 2016, against Polish boxer Artur Szpilka (20–1, 15 KOs), ranked #6 by the WBC, at the Barclays Center, Brooklyn, New York, where the winner would be scheduled to fight WBC mandatory challenger Alexander Povetkin. A crowd of 12,668 mostly pro-Polish fans was announced. Szpilka looked very strong as the bout began, and won the first three rounds with his awkward southpaw stance, rapid foot movement, and talent for slipping punches. Szpilka made Wilder appear wild with his punches, as Wilder missed 175 punches thrown at Szpilka, mostly head punches. Entering round nine, Szpilka, aware from the ring commentators he could no longer win the fight on the cards, changed strategy and took a gamble. Going to the inside, Szpilka swung for the rafters, but Wilder read Szpilka and connected first with a powerful right hand to the face. Szpilka fell to the canvas, and his head jerked backwards in a reflex motion, abruptly ending the competitive contest and sending the ringside physicians and emergency medical personnel immediately into the ring. At the time of the stoppage, Wilder was winning the bout with the scores of 78–74 (twice) and 77–75. Wilder reportedly earned a career-high $1.5 million compared to Szpilka, who had a $250,000 purse. The fight averaged 500,000 viewers and peaked at 623,000 viewers.

After the fight, newly crowned heavyweight champion Tyson Fury entered the ring going face-to-face in a heated verbal exchange with Wilder, calling him out. In the post-fight press conference, Wilder rated his performance at 5/10. Wilder was not in a celebratory mood and said his concerns for Szpilka meant he was not in the mood for the confrontation with Fury. Wilder explained "We risk our lives in there for your entertainment. I want to knock my opponents out, but not hurt them. I want them to be able to go home to their family." Szpilka regained consciousness before leaving the ring on a stretcher and recovered. The knockout was voted "Knockout of The Year" by Premier Boxing Champions.

==== Canceled Wilder vs. Povetkin fight ====
Wilder was due to make the fourth defense of his WBC heavyweight title against former WBA (Regular) champion and mandatory challenger Alexander Povetkin (30–1, 22 KOs) on May 21, 2016, at the Megasport Arena in Moscow, Russia. Povetkin was considered by many to be Wilder's toughest opponent to date, and was on a four-fight knockout streak since suffering his only defeat to Wladimir Klitschko in late 2013. Wilder did not seem to be worried by the defense and saw this as a big name in the heavyweight division that he could add to his legacy, saying "Going to Russia is going to be nothing for me, I'm going to treat it like it's the U.S. because at the end of the day, it's one man, one ring. When I knock him out and come back, it's going to bring my legacy even bigger than it is now." He also added, "I think this is going to be an easier fight than Stiverne, I really believe that. To be proven wrong, we're going to find out." World of Boxing promoter Andrey Ryabinsky won the rights for the fight with a winning purse bid of $7.15 million, higher than the $5.1 million bid from Lou DiBella. Due to the 70–30 split, Wilder was looking at a minimum $4,504,500, a career-high payday.

However, a week before the fight on May 14, it was reported that Povetkin had tested positive for the banned substance meldonium. Promoter Andrei Ryabinsky added that Povetkin did take meldonium in 2015, but stopped before it was banned, and only "leftover traces of meldonium at a very low concentration (70 nanograms)" were found in a blood sample given by the 36-year-old last month. Hours after, Wilder and his team skipped their flight to Moscow; the WBC, having little choice what with the titleholder preparing to return home, postponed the fight. Jay Deas, Wilder's manager and trainer, said the fight was off as did promoter Lou DiBella. Andrey Ryabinskiy, promoter for Povetkin, claimed the fight would take place at a later date. Wilder claimed he was still interested in fighting and beating Povetkin in the future, as this was a fight he had trained hard for and was hoping to make a statement against an elite heavyweight. On February 14, 2017, Wilder won $7 million plus legal fees after taxes over the cancellation of the fight.

==== Wilder vs. Arreola ====
Following Wilder's return to the U.S., on May 26, former two-time world title challenger Chris Arreola (36–4–1–2, 31 KOs) became the frontrunner to challenge Wilder. At the time, Arreola was not ranked by the WBC because he had tested positive for marijuana after his fight against Travis Kauffman. Arreola's 90-day suspension ended in March 2016 and he was likely to re-enter the WBC rankings. By June 13, the fight was confirmed and would take place on July 16, 2016, at the Legacy Arena, Birmingham, Alabama. For the fight, Wilder wore white trunks with black trim, featuring a portrait of his personal idol and the late heavyweight boxing legend Muhammad Ali who had died recently. The attendance at the arena was announced as being 11,974. Wilder dominated the entire fight with his sharp jab, which caused severe swelling to Arreola's left eye. In the fourth round, Wilder connected with a heavy right cross that knocked Arreola down. After eight rounds, Arreola's cornermen informed the referee to stop the contest. After the fight, Wilder stated he had broken his right hand and torn his biceps during the fight. Wilder was ahead 80–71, 80–71, and 79–72 on the scorecards at the time of stoppage. According to CompuBox statistics, Wilder landed 152 of 346 punches (44%), and Arreola landed 52 of 188 (28%). For the fight, Wilder earned $1.4 million to Arreola's $150,000. The fight averaged 1.8 million viewers on FOX and peaked at 2.54 million viewers, with the whole telecast averaging 1.45 million viewers.

According to promoter Lou DiBella, Wilder spent most of the night at UAB Hospital. He would be back at the hospital soon, likely for two surgeries, one to repair each injury. This ruled him out for the remainder of 2016. "Deontay is definitely out for the remainder of the year, but we will know more in the next few days," DiBella said.

==== Wilder vs. Washington ====
Wilder announced in November that he had fully recovered and was back in training following surgery. His return fight was scheduled to be in early 2017. In December, Peter Fury announced there were active talks to get Hughie Fury a world title fight against Wilder for the first quarter of 2017. Fury would not be considered as a voluntary due to being ranked at number 26 by the WBC, but Peter hoped Fury would be bumped into the top 15 after the WBC convention in December.

On December 21, 2016, according to Wilder's manager Jay Deas, there were advance talks for a fight to take place on February 25, 2017, at the Legacy Arena in Alabama against 29 year-old two-time Polish heavyweight champion and former world-title challenger Andrzej Wawrzyk (33–1, 19 KOs). Ranked #12 by the WBC, Wawrzyk was on a six-fight knockout streak, with a win in his most recent fight over veteran Albert Sosnowski, since his only loss to Alexander Povetkin inside the distance in May 2013. Terms were agreed to a day later as the date and venue were confirmed on December 29. After announcing Wawrzyk as his opponent, Wilder received criticism from fellow boxers, boxing experts, and fans for choosing "an easy fight," having yet another voluntary defense and not fighting a top-level heavyweight. On December 29, Wilder spoke about the criticism, not believing Wawrzyk should be written off, stating, "I don't believe 'You're going to suck because I don't know you,' that's just the ignorance of your average boxing fan ... I wish fans would stop criticizing fighters because it takes a lot to get in the ring." Wilder used Manny Pacquiao as an example for when he was little known.

On January 25, 2017, it was reported that Wawrzyk had failed a drug test, ruling him out of the fight. With a month to go until the fight, Wilder was determined to find a replacement to fight him on short notice and not postpone the fight card. Luis Ortiz put himself forward for the fight only to be shot down due to him failing drug tests in the past. Tyson Fury also put himself forward. A day later, it was reported that 35 year-old undefeated Gerald Washington (18–0–1, 12 KOs), ranked #8 by the WBC, was the most likely candidate to challenge Wilder. It was announced on January 30, 2017, that Washington would face Wilder on February 25.

In front of a hometown crowd of 12,346, Wilder won by TKO in round five. Washington started off strong with power punches as Wilder moved around with jabs. Midway through the fifth, Wilder got Washington against the ropes and landed a combination of power shots, the last shot being a left to the head of Washington, dropping him backwards against the ropes. Washington recovered quickly on unsteady legs. The fight resumed, and Wilder unloaded heavy blows to Washington's head, eventually leading referee Michael Griffin to halt the fight at 1 minute and 45 seconds of the round. Wilder credited his patience in the post-fight interview: "I knew he was going to come in excited to fight for a world title. I just kept calm and found my rhythm. I knew he was going to tire out, and when he did, I took advantage. It was all about timing. I'm very smart in the ring when it comes to using different tactics." At the time of stoppage, one judge had the fight 39–37 for Wilder, whilst the remaining two judges had the fight 38–38 after four rounds. Washington earned $250,000 from the fight while Wilder earned $900,000. CompuBox Stats showed that Wilder landed 33 of 113 punches thrown (29%) and Washington connected with 30 of his 98 thrown (31%). The fight was televised on Fox in the U.S. and was watched by an average audience of 1.76 million viewers, peaking at 1.86 million. The bout was the most watched boxing match in the United States for 2017, until the Thurman-Garcia unification fight drew 3.74 million on March 4.

Following the fight, there was an altercation between Wilder and Dominic Breazeale, who had knocked out Izuagbe Ugonoh on the undercard. Breazeale claimed that Wilder and his entourage attacked him in front of his wife at the Westin Birmingham hotel. This came after Breazeale supposedly had a fracas with Wilder's younger brother, Marsellos, at ringside during Wilder's fight.

==== Wilder vs. Stiverne II ====
On February 27, 2017, the WBC ordered Wilder to fight mandatory challenger Bermane Stiverne, with negotiations to begin immediately. On July 18, 2017, it was reported that a deal was being negotiated for Wilder to make his sixth defense of his WBC title against heavyweight contender Luis Ortiz (27–0, 23 KOs, 2 NC). Wilder's promoter Lou DiBella, had put the Barclays Center in Brooklyn on hold for October 14 and November 4, 2017. According to sources, Stiverne's promotor Don King had reported to be working out a step-a-side fee from Wilder and Ortiz's advisor Al Haymon. Stiverne told Boxing Scene that Don King had not been given any permission to negotiate a step-a-side fee and he would work with his management team to ensure he challenges for the WBC title in his next fight. It was reported by VADA, who oversees the WBC Clean Boxing Program, that Stiverne missed a drug test, which the WBC treated as tantamount to failing a test. WBC president Mauricio Sulaiman worked on a deal to finalise Wilder vs. Ortiz for November 4, 2017. According to TheRing.tv, Stiverne agreed to a mid six-figure payday to allow the fight to take place. On September 12, it was reported by Showtime that the fight was a done deal, awaiting official announcement for the fight to take place on November 4 at Barclays Center in Brooklyn. Showtime revealed the card would include Daniel Jacobs as chief support. On September 18, the fight was made official pending the official press conference, which would take place the next day. ESPN was advised that Stiverne would fight Breazeale on the undercard in a title eliminator. It was reported on September 29, Ortiz had failed a drug test. It was believed that the drugs in question were diuretics chlorothiazide and hydrochlorothiazide, which are used to treat high blood pressure but also can be used as masking agents for performance-enhancing drug use. A urine sample was taken on September 22 in Miami. Ortiz never informed VADA that he had been on medication.

On October 4, the WBC withdrew its sanction on the Wilder vs. Ortiz fight and ordered Wilder to fight mandatory Stiverne (25–2–1, 21 KOs). The next day, Showtime announced the fight. At the press conference, Wilder claimed that he was happy to be getting Stiverne out of the way. Stiverne officially signed the contract on October 17, confirmed by his managers Josh Dubin and James Prince. Stiverne weighed 254 3/4 pounds on the scales, 13 pounds more than he weighed in the first fight and 34 pounds more than Wilder, who came in at 220 3/4 pounds. It was revealed that Wilder would earn a purse of $1.4 million and Stiverne would take home $506,250 as mandatory. Before the bout, longtime sparring partner Alonzo Butler predicted Wilder would dispatch Stiverne in fewer than five rounds.

On fight night, in front of 10,924, Wilder retained his WBC title with a commanding first-round knockout. Wilder knocked Stiverne down three times before referee Arthur Mercante Jr. stopped the fight at 2:59 of the round. Wilder started the fight using his jab to keep Stiverne at distance. A right hand put Stiverne down for the first knockdown. As soon as the fight resumed, Wilder landed another right hand, putting Stiverne down a second time. The final knockdown saw Stiverne against the ropes, when Wilder connected with another right, followed by a left hook to the head. At this point, with Stiverne defenseless, the fight was stopped. In the post-fight interview, Wilder said, "You have to give props to Stiverne for getting in the ring. It takes a lot of courage and it takes a lot of pride to step in the ring with someone like me. We do what we have to do in the ring and at least he stepped up. He was a clean fighter." When asked about a future fight with Anthony Joshua, he said, "I've been waiting on that fight for a long time now. I declare war upon you. Do you accept my challenge? I've been waiting for a long time. I know I'm the champion. I know I'm the best. Are you up for the test?" With the win, Wilder had now knocked out every opponent he had fought. CompuBox Stats showed that Stiverne threw only 2 jabs and 2 power shots, not landing any. Wilder landed 15 of his 39 punches thrown (38%). The fight drew an average of 824,000 viewers and peaked at 887,000 viewers on Showtime. This was slightly less than the first fight, which took place in January 2015.

==== Wilder vs. Ortiz ====
Luis Ortiz made his return to the ring after the failed drug test by knocking out journeyman Daniel Martz on December 8. Wilder was ringside on commentary for the fight. After the fight, Ortiz called out Wilder, who then stepped into the ring and said to Ortiz, "I guarantee you, you'll have the fight." On December 19, negotiations resumed between Wilder and Ortiz, with a potential fight for Wilder's WBC heavyweight title to take place at the Barclays Center in Brooklyn on March 3, 2018. According to RingTV on December 30, an agreement had been reached. Terms were agreed on January 12 and the fight was officially announced on January 23. Wilder weighed his lightest since turning professional in 2006, at 214 pounds. Ortiz came in at 241 1/4 pounds.

Wilder overcame difficulties and knocked Ortiz out in round ten to retain his WBC title in front of a crowd of 14,069. Both boxers started the fight cautiously with Wilder throwing jabs; however, Ortiz seemed to do more in the opening four rounds, throwing combinations. Wilder took control in round five, knocking Ortiz down once. Wilder was hurt badly in round seven by a left hand from Ortiz. Wilder was then trapped on the ropes taking head and body shots from Ortiz. Referee David Fields kept a close eye on Wilder and appeared to be close to stopping the fight, but Wilder survived the round. Despite Ortiz not managing to drop Wilder in round seven, all three judges scored the round 10–8 for Ortiz. Wilder used rounds eight and nine to rest up and managed to avoid any punishment. Wilder hurt Ortiz with a right hand at the end of round nine. The following round, Wilder unloaded on Ortiz, who at this point looked tired, dropping him twice before the match was halted by David Fields. The official time of the stoppage was at 2:05 of round ten.

At the time of stoppage, all three judges had their scorecards 85–84 in favor of Wilder. After the fight, Wilder spoke about his win and praised Ortiz, "'King Kong' ain't got nothing on me. A true champion always finds a way to come back, and that's what I did tonight. Luis Ortiz is definitely a crafty guy. He put up a great fight. We knew we had to wear him down. I showed everyone I can take a punch. When Ortiz leaves tonight, he can hold his head high. He gave the fans a hell of a fight." Ortiz also gave his thoughts on the fight: speaking through a translator, he said, "I feel fine. I did receive a right hand, but I'm OK. I was listening to the directions that my corner was giving me. In this sport, any punch can end a fight. It was a great fight, and I performed well." According to CompuBox Stats, Wilder landed 98 of 346 punches thrown (28%) and Ortiz landed 87 of his 363 thrown (24%). For the fight, Wilder earned a career-high $2.1 million and Ortiz received a $500,000 purse. The event was Barclays Center's second-biggest boxing crowd after Thurman vs. Garcia, which was attended by 16,533 in March 2017. The fight averaged 1.1 million viewers and peaked at 1.2 million on Showtime. The last time Showtime registered over 1 million viewers was in 2015 when Wilder defeated Stiverne for the WBC title.

==== Wilder vs. Fury ====
From April until the end of June 2018, both the Joshua and Wilder camps were in talks over a heavyweight unification fight. The main hurdles were purse split, date and venue. At one point, Wilder had agreed to fight Joshua in the UK; however, there was some confusion in the contracts being sent back and forth. At the same time, Eddie Hearn was working a deal out for Joshua to fight WBA mandatory challenger Alexander Povetkin (34–1, 24 KOs). Negotiations took a turn on June 26 when the WBA gave Joshua's camp 24 hours to finalize a deal with Povetkin. With Joshua closer to fighting Povetkin in September 2018, Hearn stated the Joshua-Wilder fight would still take place in April 2019 at Wembley Stadium. Hearn later explained that the WBA would have granted an exemption, had Wilder signed a deal to fight Joshua. On July 16, Joshua vs. Povetkin was announced for September 2018.

On July 30, it was reported that there were ongoing negotiations for a fight to take place in either November or December 2018 between former unified heavyweight world champion Tyson Fury (27–0, 19 KOs) and Wilder. On July 31, Fury stated the fight against Wilder was 99% a done deal, with only a location and date to be confirmed. Fury also had to come through in his bout against Francesco Pianeta on August 18. Wilder was scheduled to be in Belfast to further promote the fight. Fury won the bout via a points decision. During the post-fight interviews, promoter Warren confirmed the Fury vs. Wilder fight was on. The fight would take place in either Las Vegas or New York in November 2018. The fight would be aired on PPV in the United States on Showtime and in the UK on BT Sports Box Office. Talking about how the fight came together, Fury said, "We have two men who will fight anyone. This man has been trying to make a fight with another chump. They called, I answered. I said: 'Send me the contract.' They sent it. I said 'yes'." Warren later told BBC Radio 5 live, "[It's a] 50–50 [purse split], quick and smooth negotiations. He was the world heavyweight champion. He's undefeated. [Wilder and his team] understand that. All of the terms are agreed."

By the end of August, contracts for the fight to take place had been signed. On September 22, both fighters confirmed they had signed the contract and the fight would take place on December 1, 2018. According to the California State Athletic Commission, Wilder would earn a guaranteed base purse of $4 million and Fury would take home a guaranteed purse of $3 million. Despite Frank Warren's original claim that the revenue would be split 50-50, it was revealed that Wilder could make $14 million (£10.94 million) and Fury would earn around $10.25 million (£8 million). Both boxers would see this increase to their base purses after receiving their percentages from pay-per-view revenue.

The weigh-in took place on November 30, outside the Los Angeles Convention Center. Fury stepped on the scale first and weighed in at 256 1/2 pounds, his lightest since his comeback following his lay off. The weight was only 2 pounds less than he weighed in August 2018 against Francisco Pianeta; however, he looked slimmer and leaner. Wilder came in at 212 1/2 pounds, his lowest since his debut in 2008 when he weighed 207 1/4 pounds. For his last bout, Wilder weighed 214 pounds; however, it was said that Wilder suffered an illness during his training camp.

In front of a crowd of 17,698 at the Staples Center, Wilder and Fury fought a twelve-round split decision draw, meaning Wilder retained his WBC title. Mexican judge Alejandro Rochin scored the fight 115–111 for Wilder, Canadian judge Robert Tapper had it 114–112 for Fury and British judge Phil Edwards scored it a 113–113 draw. The crowd booed at the decision with many believing Fury did enough to dethrone Wilder. Fury, using his unorthodox stance, spent much of the fight using upper and lower-body movement to avoid Wilder's big shots and stay out of range.

There was not much action in round one as both boxers used the round to feel each other out. Wilder tried to trap Fury into the corner, but Fury made Wilder miss most of his big swings. In round four, Wilder bloodied Fury's nose with his stiff jabs, but was unable to follow up on the attacks. In round six, Fury switched to southpaw stance and had success backing Wilder against the ropes and at the same time stayed cautious of Wilder's power. In round seven, after trading jabs, which saw Fury come out on top, Fury landed a counter right hand, then quickly tied Wilder up before he could throw anything back. Round eight saw back and forth action with both trying to land. Wilder threw a lot of power shots which Fury mostly evaded. In round nine, Wilder dropped Fury with a short left hook followed by an overhand right. Fury beat referee Jack Reiss' count and survived the round. Having expended plenty of energy trying to finish Fury in round nine, Wilder looked fatigued in round ten. This came to as an advantage for Fury as he landed two right hands. Fury also took advantage in round eleven, landing shots and avoiding anything Wilder could throw. In round twelve, Wilder landed a right-left combination which put Fury down hard on his back. The crowd, commentary team, and Wilder believed the fight was over. Reiss looked at Fury on the canvas and began giving him a count. To everyone's surprise, Fury beat the count. Reiss made Fury walk towards him and called for the action to continue. Wilder, fatigued again, was unable to land another power shot and Fury landed some right hands to finish the round and the fight on his feet. Both boxers embraced in a hug after the final bell sounded.

According to CompuBox statistics, Wilder landed 71 punches of 430 thrown (17%), and Fury landed 84 of his 327 thrown (26%). Wilder was much less accurate in this fight than he usually had been in previous fights. Fury out-landed Wilder in nine out of the twelve rounds. Both Wilder and Fury only landed double digits in four separate rounds.

After the fight, both men gave in-ring interviews. Wilder stated, "I think with the two knockdowns, I definitely won the fight. We poured our hearts out tonight. We're both warriors. I rushed my punches. I didn't sit still. I was too hesitant. I started overthrowing the right hand, and I just couldn't adjust. I was rushing my punches. That's something I usually don't do." Fury said, "We're on away soil. I got knocked down twice, but I still believe I won that fight. I'm being a total professional here. God bless America. The 'Gypsy King' has returned. That man is a fearsome puncher, and I was able to avoid that. The world knows I won the fight. I hope I did you all proud after nearly three years out of the ring. I showed good heart to get up. I came here tonight, and I fought my heart out."

Wilder and Fury both claimed to be the best heavyweights in the world and both called out unified world champion Anthony Joshua. Fury shouted, "Chicken! Chicken! Joshua, where are you?" Wilder then agreed to state the two best heavyweights got into the ring and fought.

The event was both a critical and a commercial success. The fight reportedly sold approximately 350,000 pay-per-view buys on Showtime in the United States, grossing around $30 million, making it the most lucrative heavyweight fight in the country since John Ruiz vs. Roy Jones Jr. in 2003. Showtime's delayed broadcast a week later drew an average 488,000 viewers and peaked at 590,000 viewers.

==== Wilder vs. Breazeale ====
On the evening of May 18, 2019, Wilder defended his WBC heavyweight title against mandatory challenger Dominic Breazeale, who was ranked #4 by the WBC, via knockout with 43 seconds left in the first round. Wilder caught him with a powerful right which sent Breazeale flat on his back and unable to continue with the referee waving off the contest after reaching the ten count.

Prior to the fight, Wilder had again made controversial comments about wanting to kill an opponent in the ring, saying he was "trying to get a body on my record," and that "[boxing] is the only sport where you can kill a man and get paid for it at the same time." This was not the first time Wilder had alluded to killing an opponent, having made similar remarks previously in 2017 about Bermane Stiverne. However, despite the pre-fight animosity, the two men reconciled after the fight's conclusion, with Wilder saying "I've told him [Breazeale] I love him and I want to see him go home to his family."

==== Wilder vs. Ortiz II ====
In a rematch of their 2018 fight, Wilder faced Luis Ortiz again on November 23, 2019, winning by seventh-round knockout to retain his WBC heavyweight title after being behind on all three of the judges' scorecards 58–56 and 59–55 (twice). After the fight, Wilder was full of praise for his opponent, calling Ortiz "the most dangerous heavyweight in the division" and "an amazing fighter." Ortiz was ranked #3 by the WBC at the time. Wilder's knockout of Ortiz was selected as the winner of The Ring Magazine Knockout of The Year award for 2019.

His rematch with Ortiz had been the sixth time Wilder had fought a boxer who was ranked in the global heavyweight top ten by BoxRec within a year of the bout. The others were Malik Scott (KO 1), Bermane Stiverne (UD 12), Luis Ortiz in their first match (TKO 10), Tyson Fury (SD 12), and Dominic Breazeale (KO 1).

The win marked Wilder's tenth successful consecutive defense of his heavyweight title, matching Muhammad Ali's record of ten consecutive defenses. Wilder was happy to accomplish the feat: "It feels amazing. Muhammad Ali is one of my idols." Wilder and Ali's feat is only bettered by Joe Louis, Larry Holmes, Wladimir Klitschko and Tommy Burns. Wilder failed to surpass Ali's total, as he went on to lose his next fight.

==== Wilder vs. Fury II ====
On November 27, 2019, it was announced that Wilder would face Tyson Fury on February 22, 2020, in a rematch of their 2018 bout which resulted in a draw. Wilder weighed in at a career-heaviest 231 lbs, while Fury at 273 lbs also weighed in heavier for the rematch than he did for the first bout. Despite the former entering the fight as the slight betting favorite, he was dropped by Fury with a left hook, overhand right combination in the third round. In the fifth round, Fury knocked Wilder down again, this time with a body shot. Wilder ultimately lost the fight via seventh-round technical knockout when his trainer Mark Breland threw in the towel, losing his WBC heavyweight title in the process. At the time of the stoppage, Wilder was behind on the scorecards 59–52 (twice) and 58–53. According to CompuBox, Fury landed 82 of his 267 total punches (31%), including 58 out of 160 power punches (36%). Wilder landed 34 of his 141 total punches (24%), including 18 out of 55 power punches (33%).

In the post-fight interview, Wilder's head trainer Jay Deas stated that he disagreed with his co-trainer's decision to stop the fight, saying "Mark [Breland] threw in the towel, I didn't think he should've. Deontay's the kind of guy that's a go out on his shield kind of guy and he will tell you straight up 'Don't throw the towel in'." At a cost of $79.99, the bout generated between 800,000 and 850,000 pay-per-view buys in the United States via traditional television providers, up from approximately 325,000 buys for the first fight. Bob Arum estimated that there were "well over" 300,000 buys via digital platforms (placing the estimated total closer to 1.2 million).

Wilder attributed his defeat to factors including his water "being spiked as if I took a muscle relaxer," his ring-walk costume being "way too heavy for me... it weighed 40lb with the helmet and all the batteries," and that Fury had "scratched flesh out of my ears which caused them to bleed." Wilder's attempts at justifying his loss were widely criticized and labeled by many as "excuses," including by Tyson Fury himself, former undisputed heavyweight champion Mike Tyson, and British heavyweight rivals Anthony Joshua and Dillian Whyte. Despite the widespread criticism of Wilder's allegations, for which he provided no credible evidence to support, he did not back down; on October 31, 2020, he issued a series of statements on social media continuing to accuse Fury of cheating, as well as asking for a trilogy bout. In one tweet directed at Fury, Wilder stated, "I was offered more money to fight [Anthony] Joshua than I was getting to fight you [Fury]." Both Joshua and his promoter Eddie Hearn reacted by confirming the veracity of the statement, happy at its implication that it was Wilder who had previously avoided a proposed undisputed fight with Joshua, and not the other way around.

=== Post-title career ===
==== Wilder vs. Fury III ====
On May 17, 2021, arbitration judge Daniel Weinstein ruled that WBC and The Ring champion Tyson Fury will have to honor a contractual clause which calls for a third fight with Wilder. Subsequently, Fury's promoter Bob Arum claimed that the Allegiant Stadium in Las Vegas had been reserved for July 24, 2021, in anticipation of Wilder's trilogy fight with Fury. On June 3, Wilder stated that his "mind is very violent," and that he had "built a whole facility to commit a legal homicide" against Fury. Fury is the third opponent that Wilder has alluded to having intentions of killing, having previously made similar death threats in the past to Bermane Stiverne and Dominic Breazeale.

That same month, it was announced that Wilder had appointed his former rival-turned-friend Malik Scott as his new head trainer, calling Scott a "genius." Ahead of the pre-fight press conference on June 15, the venue was officially confirmed as T-Mobile Arena in Las Vegas. The bout was postponed from the original date of July 24 until October 9 after Fury's camp suffered an outbreak of COVID-19. At the pre-fight weigh-in on October 8, both men weighed in at their respective career-heaviest weights, with the champion Fury weighing in at 277 lbs, and the challenger Wilder at 238 lbs.

On the night of the fight, both men exchanged a total of five knockdowns as Fury won the bout via eleventh-round knockout. Wilder had started the first round well, jabbing the champion to the body and landing several clean right hands to his chest and stomach, doing enough to win the first round on all three judges' scorecards. In the second, Fury landed some good shots in the clinch. Midway through the third, Fury sent Wilder to the canvas with a series of hard right hands, and continued to pummel him as Wilder was effectively saved by the bell. Wilder came back in the fourth with a vicious short right hand that put Fury down on the canvas. Wilder continued coming forwards, and sent the champion down again towards the end of the round. In the middle rounds, Fury recovered and started landing with more regularity, racking up a commanding lead on the cards and marking up Wilder's face badly, with the latter now visibly exhausted as a result of all of the punishment he had taken. In the tenth, Wilder was decked by a huge right hook, but came back yet again with a huge series of wild swings that caught Fury at the bell. With Wilder badly hurt and bleeding, Fury managed to finish his opponent in the eleventh round with a clean right hook thrown from the clinch. Referee Robert Mora waved the contest off with Wilder face-down on the canvas. After the fight, Fury praised his opponent, calling Wilder a "top fighter," but criticized him for being a "sore loser" and refusing to "show any sportsmanship or respect." Before being taken to hospital for precautionary post-fight checks, Wilder provided his assessment of the fight: "I did my best, but it wasn't good enough tonight. I'm not sure what happened."

At the time of the stoppage, Wilder was behind on all three judges' scorecards with 95–91, 94–92, and 95–92. According to CompuBox, Fury landed 150 of 385 punches (39%), while Wilder connected with 72 of 355 punches (20%). The 150 punches landed on Wilder is the most ever landed by an opponent. Despite the back and forth nature of the bout, CompuBox calculated Fury as having outlanded Wilder in every single round of the fight, including the fourth round in which Fury was knocked down twice. The fight was widely acclaimed by observers and pundits for its action and high-level intensity: hall-of-fame promoter Bob Arum said, "I've been in this business 57 years promoting fights and I have to say I've truly never seen a heavyweight fight as magnificent as this," while the Ring magazine described it as "the obvious fight of the year so far" and "a rare and historic heavyweight championship trilogy."

Six days after the conclusion of the fight, on October 15, Wilder released a statement on social media paying tribute to God, his team, his fans and Fury: "I would like to first and foremost thank God for allowing me to give the world another part of me that's driven with passion and determination. I would like to thank my team and my fans for sticking by my side through this long process... Last but not least I would like to congratulate Tyson Fury for his victory and thank you for the great historical memories that will last forever."

==== Wilder vs. Helenius ====
In August 2022, it was announced that Wilder will have his first fight a year later after his Fury loss. It was announced Wilder would be facing Finland's Robert Helenius, with the fight scheduled to take place on October 15, 2022, at Brooklyn's Barclays Center. On fight night, Wilder knocked out Helenius with a short right hand at 2:57 of the first round.

==== Wilder vs. Parker ====
On November 15, 2023, Riyadh Season announced a blockbuster card to take place at the Kingdom Arena on December 23, 2023. The headline for the event, billed as Day of Reckoning was Anthony Joshua vs. Otto Wallin, with Wilder in the co-feature bout against former WBO champion Joseph Parker (33–3, 23 KOs) in a 12-round non-title heavyweight fight. Many other heavyweight contenders such as Daniel Dubois, Jarrell Miller, Frank Sanchez and amongst others were also scheduled to appear on the card. The event was set up to further set up a future long-awaited showdown between Wilder and Joshua, with the assumption they both win their respective bouts. Many observers, including the boxers involved felt Parker and Wilder was the better fight on the card and should headline. Wilder made the case that both he and Parker were former world champions and said it was more exciting fight. Wilder also suggested a coin flip to decide the main event; however, nothing came from this. Parker's team were going into this fight knowing they were capable of forcing a stoppage. The year marked Parkers busiest fighting four times, since 2016 where Parker fought five times. By the time of the fight, Wilder would have not fought in 14 months, having last fought in October 2023, where he stopped Robert Helenius in round one. After the official press conference, Riyadh Season agreed terms with DAZN to broadcast the event on their pay-per-view platform in the UK, U.S. and other worldwide markets. The price tag of £19.95 in the UK was met with praise from boxing fans. A price tag of 39.99 USD was also confirmed for USA and Canada. TNT Sports Box Office and ESPN+ PPV later picked up the event in the UK and U.S., respectively.

With all the talk of the possible fight with Joshua, Wilder felt many were overlooking Parker as his opponent. Wilder felt he was taking the bigger risk of the two by fighting Parker. Eddie Hearn had already stated that Joshua would fight Wilder next rather than Filip Hrgović, who was also linked. Wilder felt there was more pressure on him than Joshua, as he had not been active for over 12 months heading into the fight. Also, the fact that Joshua-Wilder was a huge fight the boxing world had been looking forward to for at least seven years. When asked how the fight would go, Wilder said although he would not look for the knockout, he still expected to win within four rounds. During a face-off segment, both boxers discussed Wilder's inactivity. Wilder brushed off any concerns about ring rust. Heading into the fight, DraftKings sportsbook had Wilder as a 6–1 favourite. The weigh in took place the day before, with Parker weighing in at 245.1 pounds. This was 5 pounds lighter than his previous fight. Wilder weighed 213 pounds.

On that night, Parker put on a career-best performance, out-boxing Wilder and winning the fight via unanimous decision by judges' scores of 118–111, 118–110, and 120–108. Some felt it was an easy win for Parker, considering Wilder's tactics and low output. Parker fought smart, out-boxed and out-worked Wilder in all the rounds. He also managed to stay clear of Wilder's right hand and in return landed his own power punches to the body and head. As the rounds went on, Parker gained more control, applied pressure and used his jab to set up shots to the head. Parker was courageous as the rounds continued, catching Wilder with eye-catching shots and working him against the ropes. Despite the pre-fight talk, Wilder did show ring-rust. His shots were thrown with little accuracy and did not let his right hand go. The action heated up in round 7, when Parker had Wilder against ropes and landed a triple hook to the head. Parker then had Wilder hurt again in round 8 when he threw more heavy shots, whilst Wilder was against the ropes. Wilder had to force a hold to avoid further punishment. From that point, Wilder's legs became unstable. According to Compubox, Wilder landed 39 of his 204 punches thrown (19.1%) and Parker landed 89 of his 255 thrown (34.9%). Parker landed more than double the amount of power shots through the 12 rounds.

Parker beating Wilder, seemed to derail his future fight against Joshua. Parker said, "We trained very hard for this. Everyone had other plans, but this is God's plan. I was really fit. I stayed calm, relaxed, stayed focused. There's always things to work on but I got the win. Merry Christmas to us." Wilder said despite the loss, he was very happy. He was unsure why he was unable to let his hands go and said his timing was off. Parker admitted he did catch a few of Wilder's right hands, saying he did punch hard. Despite Wilder losing, Joshua stopped Wallin in their fight, and although the fight would not likely happen next, Joshua was hopeful the fight could still happen in the future, as the fans deserved it.

Despite speculation that retirement was imminent, Wilder declared on his Instagram page that he would not be retiring: "Sorry if I let anyone down. But we'll be back, that's the good thing about it. This is not the end, we'll be back."

==== Wilder vs. Zhang ====
Wilder faced Zhilei Zhang (26–2–1, 21 KOs) on June 1, 2024, as the main event of the Queensberry vs Matchroom 5v5 fight card in Riyadh, Saudi Arabia. He lost in the fifth round by technical knockout.

==== Wilder vs. Herndon ====
On January 14, 2025 it was reported that Wilder would make his ring return against Curtis Harper in Atlanta, Georgia on April 26, live on BLK Prime. The fight was never officially announced. On March 28, Global Combat Collective announced Wilder's next fight would be streamed on BLK Prime; however, he fought 37-year-old journeyman Tyrrell Anthony Herndon (24–5, 15 KOs) at Charles Koch Arena in Wichita, Kansas on June 27, 2025 in a 10-round bout. The event was billed as "Legacy Reloaded." Herndon's last defeat came to prospect Richard Torrez in October 2023 and had since been on a three-fight win streak. Wilder scored his first win since 2022 after dropping Herndon twice before stopping him in the seventh round. Wilder started the fight with his jab. He landed a hook which dropped Herndon in the second round. Herndon tried to tell the referee it was a slip. Wilder remaining in control of the fight and in the sixth dropped Herndon again following right hands. He beat the count only to be dropped again by a big shot as the bell rang to end the round. Wilder came out confident in the seventh. He missed a few swinging shots. At this stage, Herndon was in survival mode. Later in the round, Wilder landed two more right hands before referee Ray Corona stopped the fight. After the fight, Wilder said, "I give thanks to my opponent. You're a tough guy, man. I appreciate the work. I laid off a long time, getting myself back together, mentally, physically and emotionally. It's been a long road for me. I'm just glad to be back in the ring." Prior to the fight, Wilder claimed he was looking to continue fighting on. According to CompuBox, Wilder landed 59 of his 457 punches thrown (12.9%), while Herndon was less busy, but more accurate, landing 15 of 85 thrown (17.6%).

==== Wilder vs. Chisora ====
In January 2026, it was confirmed that Wilder would face Derek Chisora at The O2 Arena in London, England on April 4, 2026. It was both fighters' 50th professional fight. On the night of the fight, Wilder dominated the early rounds and Chisora rallied late, with Wilder scoring knockdowns in the 8th and 11th rounds. The judges were split: Wilder received scores of 115–111 and 115–113, and the third picked Chisora by 115–112, giving Wilder a win by split decision.

==== Wilder vs. TBA ====
Oleksandr Usyk had repeatedly stated a desire for his last fight to be against Wilder in the United States. Negotiations took place for the fight after Usyk defeated Dutch kickboxer Rico Verhoeven in May 2026. It was first reported on October 10, 2026 by Dan Rafael, that undefeated cruiserweight world champion Jai Opetaia (31–0, 24 KOs) was moving up to heavyweight to fight Wilder. Shelly Finkel, Wilder's manager said a fight against Usyk fell apart after Usyk asked for more money. He was then approached by Turki Alalshikh for Wilder to fight Opetaia on the undercard of the mega heavyweight showdown between Tyson Fury and Anthony Joshua, on December 11, 2026, at the Principality Stadium in Cardiff. An agreement was reached on 31 October between the two teams. The fight was made official and announced on November 4. On November 17, it was reported that Opetaia had pulled out of the fight due to an hand injury. It was said that Wilder would remain on the card.

== Personal life ==
Wilder has eight children. Wilder's first child, a daughter with ex-girlfriend Helen Duncan, was born in 2005 with spina bifida. Wilder also has two other daughters and one son with Jessica Scales-Wilder, whom he married in 2009 and later divorced. Wilder is currently engaged to and has a child with Telli Swift and has been featured on the reality television show, WAGS Atlanta. Wilder and Swift have since separated.

Wilder comes from a family of Alabama preachers, namely his father and grandmother. He has three sisters and one younger brother. His brother, Marsellos Wilder, is also a professional boxer; Marsellos last fought in 2022 in the cruiserweight division and has a 5–3 record. As a youngster, Wilder attended church every week. He has referred to his belief in Christianity, saying that "God is very important in my life."

On May 4, 2013, Las Vegas police were called at around 7:30 a.m. for a reported battery at a hotel in the 3700 block of South Las Vegas Boulevard, where Wilder and a woman were taken into custody. He was held at Clark County Detention Center on charges of domestic battery by strangulation, and was released on a $15,000 bond. According to the police, "the woman had swollen eyebrows, a possibly broken nose, a cut lip, and red marks on her neck." She was taken to the University Medical Center of Southern Nevada and treated for her injuries. Wilder's attorney Paul Patterson claimed Wilder had "instinctively acted under the false impression that someone was stealing from him," and that he "regrets his actions." He had apparently been in Las Vegas to watch the Floyd Mayweather Jr. vs. Robert Guerrero fight.

In May 2022, Wilder was honored with a statue in his hometown of Tuscaloosa, Alabama. The statue is made out of bronze in homage to Wilder's fight nickname, "The Bronze Bomber."

In January 2024, Wilder was a contestant in season 2 of the American television series The Traitors. After falsely accusing Maksim Chmerkovskiy (a "Faithful") of being a "Traitor," who was subsequently voted out, Wilder broke down in tears and decided to leave the show after episode 3.

== Professional boxing record ==
50 fights	45 wins	4 losses
By knockout	43	3
By decision	2	1
Draws	1	

No.	Result	Record	Opponent	Type	Round, time	Date	Location	Notes
50	Win	45–4–1	Derek Chisora	SD	12	Apr 4, 2026	The O2 Arena, London, England	
49	Win	44–4–1	Tyrrell Anthony Herndon	TKO	7 (10), 2:16	Jun 27, 2025	Charles Koch Arena, Wichita, Kansas, U.S.	
48	Loss	43–4–1	Zhilei Zhang	TKO	5 (12), 1:51	Jun 1, 2024	Kingdom Arena, Riyadh, Saudi Arabia	
47	Loss	43–3–1	Joseph Parker	UD	12	Dec 23, 2023	Kingdom Arena, Riyadh, Saudi Arabia	For WBO Inter-Continental and vacant WBC International heavyweight titles
46	Win	43–2–1	Robert Helenius	KO	1 (12), 2:57	Oct 15, 2022	Barclays Center, New York City, New York, U.S.	
45	Loss	42–2–1	Tyson Fury	KO	11 (12), 1:10	Oct 9, 2021	T-Mobile Arena, Paradise, Nevada, U.S.	For WBC and The Ring heavyweight titles
44	Loss	42–1–1	Tyson Fury	TKO	7 (12), 1:39	Feb 22, 2020	MGM Grand Garden Arena, Paradise, Nevada, U.S.	Lost WBC heavyweight title; For vacant The Ring heavyweight title
43	Win	42–0–1	Luis Ortiz	KO	7 (12), 2:51	Nov 23, 2019	MGM Grand Garden Arena, Paradise, Nevada, U.S.	Retained WBC heavyweight title
42	Win	41–0–1	Dominic Breazeale	KO	1 (12), 2:17	May 18, 2019	Barclays Center, New York City, New York, U.S.	Retained WBC heavyweight title
41	Draw	40–0–1	Tyson Fury	SD	12	Dec 1, 2018	Staples Center, Los Angeles, California, U.S.	Retained WBC heavyweight title
40	Win	40–0	Luis Ortiz	TKO	10 (12), 2:05	Mar 3, 2018	Barclays Center, New York City, New York, U.S.	Retained WBC heavyweight title
39	Win	39–0	Bermane Stiverne	KO	1 (12), 2:59	Nov 4, 2017	Barclays Center, New York City, New York, U.S.	Retained WBC heavyweight title
38	Win	38–0	Gerald Washington	TKO	5 (12), 1:45	Feb 25, 2017	Legacy Arena, Birmingham, Alabama, U.S.	Retained WBC heavyweight title
37	Win	37–0	Chris Arreola	RTD	8 (12), 3:00	Jul 16, 2016	Legacy Arena, Birmingham, Alabama, U.S.	Retained WBC heavyweight title
36	Win	36–0	Artur Szpilka	KO	9 (12), 2:24	Jan 16, 2016	Barclays Center, New York City, New York, U.S.	Retained WBC heavyweight title
35	Win	35–0	Johann Duhaupas	TKO	11 (12), 0:55	Sep 26, 2015	Legacy Arena, Birmingham, Alabama, U.S.	Retained WBC heavyweight title
34	Win	34–0	Éric Molina	KO	9 (12), 1:03	Jun 13, 2015	Bartow Arena, Birmingham, Alabama, U.S.	Retained WBC heavyweight title
33	Win	33–0	Bermane Stiverne	UD	12	Jan 17, 2015	MGM Grand Garden Arena, Paradise, Nevada, U.S.	Won WBC heavyweight title
32	Win	32–0	Jason Gavern	RTD	4 (10), 3:00	Aug 16, 2014	StubHub Center, Carson, California, U.S.	
31	Win	31–0	Malik Scott	KO	1 (12), 1:36	Mar 15, 2014	Coliseo Rubén Rodríguez, Bayamón, Puerto Rico	
30	Win	30–0	Nicolai Firtha	KO	4 (10), 1:26	Oct 26, 2013	Boardwalk Hall, Atlantic City, New Jersey, U.S.	Retained WBC Continental Americas heavyweight title
29	Win	29–0	Siarhei Liakhovich	KO	1 (10), 1:43	Aug 9, 2013	Fantasy Springs Resort Casino, Indio, California, U.S.	Retained WBC Continental Americas heavyweight title
28	Win	28–0	Audley Harrison	TKO	1 (12), 1:10	Apr 27, 2013	Motorpoint Arena, Sheffield, England	
27	Win	27–0	Matthew Greer	TKO	2 (8), 1:16	Jan 19, 2013	Centro de Convenciones, Villahermosa, Mexico	
26	Win	26–0	Kelvin Price	KO	3 (10), 0:51	Dec 15, 2012	Memorial Sports Arena, Los Angeles, California, U.S.	Won vacant WBC Continental Americas heavyweight title
25	Win	25–0	Damon McCreary	KO	2 (10), 0:55	Sep 8, 2012	The Hangar, Costa Mesa, California, U.S.	
24	Win	24–0	Kertson Manswell	TKO	1 (10), 2:10	Aug 4, 2012	Civic Center Expo Hall, Mobile, Alabama, U.S.	
23	Win	23–0	Owen Beck	RTD	3 (8), 3:00	Jun 23, 2012	Killer Buzz Arena, Tuscaloosa, Alabama, U.S.	
22	Win	22–0	Jesse Oltmanns	TKO	1 (8), 0:26	May 26, 2012	Oasis Hotel Complex, Cancún, Mexico	
21	Win	21–0	Marlon Hayes	TKO	4 (8), 3:00	Feb 25, 2012	Scottrade Center, St. Louis, Missouri, U.S.	
20	Win	20–0	David Long	KO	1 (8), 1:17	Nov 26, 2011	U.S. Bank Arena, Cincinnati, Ohio, U.S.	
19	Win	19–0	Daniel Cota	KO	3 (8), 2:55	Nov 5, 2011	Centro de Convenciones, Cancún, Mexico	
18	Win	18–0	Dominique Alexander	TKO	2 (6), 2:02	Aug 27, 2011	Water Oaks Farm Arena, Tuscaloosa, Alabama, U.S.	
17	Win	17–0	Damon Reed	KO	2 (6), 1:59	Jun 18, 2011	Tuscaloosa Amphitheater, Tuscaloosa, Alabama, U.S.	
16	Win	16–0	Reggie Pena	TKO	1 (6), 2:03	May 6, 2011	Fantasy Springs Resort Casino, Indio, California, U.S.	
15	Win	15–0	DeAndrey Abron	TKO	2 (6), 1:23	Feb 19, 2011	Shelton State Community College, Tuscaloosa, Alabama, U.S.	
14	Win	14–0	Danny Sheehan	KO	1 (6), 1:48	Dec 2, 2010	Hilton Towers Ballroom, Lafayette, Louisiana, U.S.	
13	Win	13–0	Harold Sconiers	TKO	4 (6), 1:09	Oct 15, 2010	Fantasy Springs Resort Casino, Indio, California, U.S.	
12	Win	12–0	Shannon Caudle	KO	1 (6), 1:04	Sep 25, 2010	Fitzgeralds Casino and Hotel, Tunica Resorts, Mississippi, U.S.	
11	Win	11–0	Dustin Nichols	TKO	1 (6), 3:00	Jul 3, 2010	Club Palace, Hattiesburg, Mississippi, U.S.	
10	Win	10–0	Alvaro Morales	TKO	3 (6), 1:23	Apr 30, 2010	Tropicana Las Vegas, Paradise, Nevada, U.S.	
9	Win	9–0	Ty Cobb	KO	1 (6), 0:33	Apr 2, 2010	The Joint, Paradise, Nevada, U.S.	
8	Win	8–0	Jerry Vaughn	KO	1 (6), 1:02	Nov 28, 2009	Duke Energy Convention Center, Cincinnati, Ohio, U.S.	
7	Win	7–0	Travis Allen	TKO	1 (4), 1:30	Aug 14, 2009	Desert Diamond Casino, Tucson, Arizona, U.S.	
6	Win	6–0	Kelsey Arnold	KO	1 (4), 1:13	Jun 26, 2009	Desert Diamond Casino, Tucson, Arizona, U.S.	
5	Win	5–0	Charles Brown	KO	1 (6), 0:55	May 23, 2009	Duke Energy Convention Center, Cincinnati, Ohio, U.S.	
4	Win	4–0	Joseph Rabotte	KO	1 (4), 2:33	Apr 24, 2009	UIC Pavilion, Chicago, Illinois, U.S.	
3	Win	3–0	Richard Greene Jr.	RTD	1 (4), 3:00	Mar 14, 2009	Duke Energy Convention Center, Cincinnati, Ohio, U.S.	
2	Win	2–0	Shannon Gray	TKO	1 (4), 2:12	Mar 6, 2009	James M. Trotter Convention Center, Columbus, Mississippi, U.S.	
1	Win	1–0	Ethan Cox	TKO	2 (4), 2:54	Nov 15, 2008	Memorial Gymnasium, Nashville, Tennessee, U.S.	

== Pay-per-view bouts ==
No.	Date	Fight	Country	Network	Buys	Source(s)
1	December 1, 2018	Deontay Wilder vs. Tyson Fury	United States	Showtime	325,000	
1	December 1, 2018	Deontay Wilder vs. Tyson Fury	United Kingdom, Ireland	BT Sport Box Office	420,000	
2	November 23, 2019	Deontay Wilder vs. Luis Ortiz II	United States	Fox Sports	225,000	
3	February 22, 2020	Deontay Wilder vs. Tyson Fury II	United States	ESPN/Fox Sports	1,200,000	
3	February 22, 2020	Deontay Wilder vs. Tyson Fury II	United Kingdom, Ireland	BT Sport Box Office	800,000	
4	October 8, 2021	Tyson Fury vs. Deontay Wilder III	United States	ESPN/Fox Sports	600,000	
4	October 8, 2021	Tyson Fury vs. Deontay Wilder III	United Kingdom, Ireland	BT Sport Box Office	300,000	
5	October 15, 2022	Deontay Wilder vs. Robert Helenius	United States	Fox Sports	75,000	
6	4 April 2026	Derek Chisora vs. Deontay Wilder	Worldwide	DAZN PPV		
Total sales					3,945,000	

== See also ==
- List of world heavyweight boxing champions
- List of WBC world champions
- List of Olympic medalists in boxing
- Boxing at the 2008 Summer Olympics

Sporting positions
Amateur boxing titles
Previous: Adam Willett	U.S. heavyweight champion 2007	Next: Jeremiah Graziano
Previous: Eric Fields	U.S. Golden Gloves heavyweight champion 2007	Next: Craig Lewis
Regional boxing titles
Vacant Title last held by Chauncy Welliver	WBC Continental Americas heavyweight champion December 15, 2012 – January 17, 2015; Won world title	Vacant Title next held by Tony Thompson
World boxing titles
Preceded by Bermane Stiverne	WBC heavyweight champion January 17, 2015 – February 22, 2020	Succeeded by Tyson Fury
Awards
Previous: Gabriel Bracero; KO1 Danny O'Connor	PBC Knockout of the Year; KO9 Artur Szpilka; 2016	Next: Deontay Wilder; KO1 Bermane Stiverne
Previous: Deontay Wilder; KO9 Artur Szpilka	PBC Knockout of the Year; KO1 Bermane Stiverne; 2017	Next: Naoya Inoue; KO1 Juan Carlos Payano
Previous: James DeGale vs. Badou Jack	PBC Fight of the Year vs. Luis Ortiz; 2018	Next: Errol Spence Jr. vs. Shawn Porter
Previous: Dominic Breazeale vs. Izu Ugonoh; Round 3	The Ring Round of the Year vs. Tyson Fury; Round 12; 2018	Next: Andy Ruiz Jr. vs. Anthony Joshua; Round 3
Previous: John Molina Jr. vs. Ivan Redkach; Round 3	PBC Round of the Year vs. Tyson Fury; Round 12; 2018	Next: Errol Spence Jr. vs. Shawn Porter; Round 11
Previous: Naoya Inoue; KO1 Juan Carlos Payano	The Ring Knockout of the Year; KO7 Luis Ortiz II; 2019	Next: Gervonta Davis; KO6 Léo Santa Cruz
Previous: Danny Garcia; TKO9 Brandon Ríos	PBC Knockout of the Year; KO7 Luis Ortiz II; 2019	Next: Alexander Povetkin; KO5 Dillian Whyte
Previous: Jose Zepeda vs. Ivan Baranchyk	The Ring Fight of the Year vs. Tyson Fury III; 2021	Next: Leigh Wood vs. Michael Conlan
Previous: Jose Zepeda vs. Ivan Baranchyk; Round 5	The Ring Round of the Year vs. Tyson Fury III; Round 4; 2021	Next: Sebastian Fundora vs. Erickson Lubin; Round 7
