= Bermane Stiverne vs. Deontay Wilder =

Boxing competition

Return to Glory
- Date: 17 January 2015
- Venue: MGM Grand Garden Arena, Paradise, Nevada
- Title(s) on the line: WBC Heavyweight Championship

Tale of the tape
| Boxer | (Canada) Bermane Stiverne | (United States) Deontay Wilder |
| Nickname | "B. Ware" | "The Bronze Bomber" |
| Hometown | Plaine-du-Nord, Haiti | Tuscaloosa, Alabama |
| Pre-fight record | 24–1–1 (21 KO) | 32–0 (32 KO) |
| Age | 36 years, 2 months | 29 years, 2 months |
| Height | 6 ft 2 in (188 cm) | 6 ft 7 in (201 cm) |
| Weight | 239 lb (108 kg) | 219 lb (99 kg) |
| Style | Orthodox | Orthodox |
| Recognition | WBC; Heavyweight Champion; The Ring; No. 2 Ranked Heavyweight; TBRB; No. 3 Ranked Heavyweight | WBC; No. 1 Ranked Heavyweight; The Ring/TBRB; No. 6 Ranked Heavyweight |

Result
- Wilder wins via 12-round unanimous decision (118-109, 119-108, 120-107)

Bermane Stiverne vs. Deontay Wilder was a professional boxing match, billed as Return to Glory, was a professional boxing match contested on 17 January 2015 for the WBC heavyweight championship.

== Background ==
Following the retirement of Vitali Klitschko in December 2013, Bermane Stiverne stopped Chris Arreola to win the vacant WBC belt.

It was announced on 13 December 2014, during the broadcast of Amir Khan vs. Devon Alexander, that Stiverne would make his first defence against 2008 Olympic Bronze medalist Deontay Wilder. Wilder had an impressive record of 32 knockouts, albeit that lack quality opposition, with only Sergei Liakhovich, Malik Scott and Audley Harrison standing out on his record. There were also questions over his chin after he was knocked down against journeyman Harold Sconiers in 2010.

This was the first Heavyweight title bout at the MGM Grand since the infamous "Bite Fight" in June 1997.

Heading into the bout boxing insiders were divided on who would win, although most expected it end in a stoppage for one or other fighter.

== The fight ==
Wilder was by far the more active boxer throwing more than double the amount of punches, using his height and reach advantage and keeping Stiverne on the outside with his left jab. At the end of the second round Stiverne, apparently hit by a punch, fell forward, which sent himself, Wilder and referee Tony Weeks down to the canvas. Weeks ruled the incident as not a knockdown. At the end of 12 rounds all 3 judges scored the bout for Wilder, with scores of 118–109, 119–108 and 120–107 giving him a Unanimous Decision win, becoming the first American to hold a version of the heavyweight title since Shannon Briggs was beaten by Sultan Ibragimov in 2007. The AP had it scored 117–111 and The Guardian had it 118–110 for Wilder. This stands as Wilders only win not via KO.

== Aftermath ==
In the post-fight press conference Wilder said that he wanted to fight unbeaten British contender Tyson Fury next before finishing the year with a showdown for Undisputed with Wladimir Klitschko. Although there were doubts raised with this plan, given Wilder's adviser Al Haymon refusal do business with HBO and that Klitschko had two fights remaining on a three-fight deal with HBO.

== Undercard ==
Confirmed bouts:

== Broadcasting ==
| Country | Broadcaster |
|---|---|
| Canada | TSN |
| Denmark | TV3 Sport |
| Mexico | TV Azteca |
| United Kingdom | BT Sport |
| United States | Showtime |

| Preceded by vs. Chris Arreola | Bermane Stiverne's bouts 17 January 2015 | Succeeded by vs. Derric Rossy |
| Preceded by vs. Jason Gavern | Deontay Wilder's bouts 17 January 2015 | Succeeded by vs. Éric Molina |
