= Éric Molina =

American boxer (born 1982)

Personal information
- Nickname: Drummer Boy
- Nationality: Mexican-American
- Born: Éric Lee Molina; April 26, 1982 (age 44) Raymondville, Texas, U.S.
- Height: 6 ft 4 in (193 cm)
- Weight: Cruiserweight; Heavyweight

Boxing career
- Reach: 79 in (201 cm)
- Stance: Orthodox

Boxing record
- Total fights: 38
- Wins: 29
- Win by KO: 21
- Losses: 9

Éric Lee Molina (born April 26, 1982) is a Mexican-American former professional boxer who competed from 2007 to 2023. He challenged twice for a world heavyweight title, in 2015 and 2016.

== Professional career ==
Molina turned professional on March 17, 2007, losing his first professional bout by knockout. Despite losing his first pro bout, Molina went on an 18-fight unbeaten streak. On January 18, 2012, he stepped up and fought former two-time world heavyweight title challenger Chris Arreola, losing the fight by first-round knockout. Two and a half years later in May 2014, Molina scored his biggest professional career win by stopping former world heavyweight title challenger DaVarryl Williamson in five rounds.

On June 13, 2015, he fought for the WBC world heavyweight title against defending champion Deontay Wilder. Molina hurt the champion during the early rounds, but was knocked out in the ninth round. Molina scored the biggest win of his entire professional career in April 2016 by stopping former two-weight world champion Tomasz Adamek in the 10th round. Later that year, on December 10, he challenged for the IBF heavyweight title against champion Anthony Joshua in Manchester, England. Molina lost by third-round knockout.

On November 4, 2017, Molina, ranked #12 by the WBC at heavyweight, faced WBO #3, WBC #6 and IBF #7 Dominic Breazeale. In the eighth round, Breazeale caught Molina with a right hand to Molina's side of his head, which prompted Molina to take a knee. Molina managed to beat the count, but didn't look fit enough to continue. Despite making it to the end of the round, Molina's corner decided to stop the fight.

On May 22, 2018, Molina was suspended from fighting in the United Kingdom for two years by the UK Anti-Doping organisation after testing positive for the prohibited substance dexamethasone, a substance that the World Anti-Doping Agency lists as being prohibited during the "in competition" period only, following his December 10, 2016 world title fight with Anthony Joshua. The suspension ran from the date of an imposed provisional suspension, which began on October 28, 2017, and ended at midnight on October 27, 2019.

On December 7, 2019, Molina faced Filip Hrgovic, ranked #9 by the WBA and the IBF and #11 by the WBC. Hrgovic dominated the fight, and finished Molina in the third.

In his next fight on March 27, 2021, Molina fought heavyweight prospect Fabio Wardley at Europa Point Sports Complex in Gibraltar. Molina caught Wardley with a right hand in the fifth round, which prompted Wardley to retaliate and floor Molina. Molina would not beat the count and Wardley was awarded the KO win against Molina.

On 23 March 2023, he lost to Simon Kean by stoppage in the seventh round at Montreal Casino in Montreal, Canada.

== Professional boxing record ==
38 fights	29 wins	9 losses
By knockout	21	9
By decision	8	0

No.	Result	Record	Opponent	Type	Round, time	Date	Location	Notes
38	Loss	29–9	Simon Kean	TKO	7 (10), 2:39	Mar 23, 2023	Montreal Casino, Montreal, Canada	
37	Win	29–8	Jose Castro	RTD	3 (8), 3:00	Jul 30, 2022	Costa Rica	
36	Loss	28–8	Alen Babić	KO	2 (8), 2:33	Oct 30, 2021	The O2 Arena, London, England	
35	Win	28–7	Alejandro de La Torre	KO	3 (8), 1:00	Aug 28, 2021	Matamoros, Mexico	
34	Loss	27–7	Fabio Wardley	KO	5 (10), 0:52	Mar 27, 2021	Europa Point Sports Complex, Gibraltar	
33	Loss	27–6	Filip Hrgović	KO	3 (12), 2:02	Dec 7, 2019	Diriyah Arena, Diriyah, Saudi Arabia	For WBC International heavyweight title
32	Win	27–5	Nick Guivas	UD	6	Feb 15, 2019	Amigoland Event Center, Brownsville, Texas, U.S.	
31	Loss	26–5	Dominic Breazeale	RTD	8 (12), 3:00	Nov 4, 2017	Barclays Center, New York City, New York, U.S.	
30	Win	26–4	Jamal Woods	MD	6	Sep 2, 2017	South Texas Fighting Academy, Palmhurst, Texas, U.S.	
29	Loss	25–4	Anthony Joshua	TKO	3 (12), 2:02	Dec 10, 2016	Manchester Arena, Manchester, England	For IBF heavyweight title
28	Win	25–3	Tomasz Adamek	KO	10 (12), 3:00	Apr 2, 2016	Tauron Arena, Kraków, Poland	Won vacant IBF Inter-Continental heavyweight title
27	Win	24–3	Rodricka Ray	TKO	6 (6), 1:17	Sep 10, 2015	Boggus Ford Events Center, Pharr, Texas, U.S.	
26	Loss	23–3	Deontay Wilder	KO	9 (12), 1:03	Jun 13, 2015	Bartow Arena, Birmingham, Alabama, U.S.	For WBC heavyweight title
25	Win	23–2	Raphael Zumbano Love	TKO	8 (8), 1:28	Jan 17, 2015	MGM Grand Garden Arena, Paradise, Nevada, U.S.	
24	Win	22–2	Theo Kruger	TKO	3 (6), 1:55	Aug 2, 2014	Boggus Ford Events Center, Pharr, Texas, U.S.	
23	Win	21–2	DaVarryl Williamson	TKO	5 (10), 2:39	May 10, 2014	Galen Center, Los Angeles, California, U.S.	
22	Win	20–2	Tony Grano	UD	12	Apr 27, 2013	Citizens Business Bank Arena, Ontario, California, U.S.	Won NABF heavyweight title
21	Win	19–2	Andrew Greeley	UD	6	Jun 16, 2012	Convention Center, McAllen, Texas, U.S.	
20	Loss	18–2	Chris Arreola	KO	1 (12), 2:30	Feb 18, 2012	American Bank Center, Corpus Christi, Texas, U.S.	Lost WBC–USNBC heavyweight title
19	Win	18–1	Warren Browning	TKO	3 (12), 0:24	Aug 13, 2011	The Joint, Paradise, Nevada, U.S.	Won vacant WBC–USNBC heavyweight title
18	Win	17–1	Joseph Rabotte	TKO	6 (6), 1:38	Mar 12, 2011	MGM Grand Garden Arena, Paradise, Nevada, U.S.	
17	Win	16–1	Rayford Johnson	UD	6	Dec 10, 2010	Casa de Amistad, Harlingen, Texas, U.S.	
16	Win	15–1	Leo Bercier	RTD	3 (6), 0:10	Sep 30, 2010	Joens Entertainment, Harlingen, Texas, U.S.	
15	Win	14–1	Chris Thomas	TKO	4 (10), 0:48	Jun 18, 2010	Convention Center, McAllen, Texas, U.S.	Retained WBC Latino cruiserweight title
14	Win	13–1	Andrew Greeley	UD	6	Feb 6, 2010	Convention Center, McAllen, Texas, U.S.	
13	Win	12–1	Gabriel Holguin	UD	10	Sep 10, 2009	Mooncussers, South Padre Island, Texas, U.S.	Won vacant WBC Latino cruiserweight title
12	Win	11–1	Clinton Bonds	KO	1 (4), 2:38	Jun 19, 2009	Dodge Arena, Hidalgo, Texas, U.S.	
11	Win	10–1	Osvaldo Martinez	TKO	3 (8), 0:45	May 15, 2009	Casa de Amistad, Harlingen, Texas, U.S.	Retained Texas cruiserweight title
10	Win	9–1	Rayford Johnson	TKO	3 (8), 2:14	Feb 27, 2009	Casa de Amistad, Harlingen, Texas, U.S.	Retained Texas cruiserweight title
9	Win	8–1	David Robinson	TKO	1 (8), 2:51	Sep 18, 2008	Casa de Amistad, Harlingen, Texas, U.S.	Won vacant Texas cruiserweight title
8	Win	7–1	Douglas Robertson	UD	4	Jul 4, 2008	Dodge Arena, Hidalgo, Texas, U.S.	
7	Win	6–1	Anthony Greeley	TKO	1 (6), 2:38	Jun 21, 2008	Rio Grande Valley Harley-Davidson, McAllen, Texas, U.S.	
6	Win	5–1	Isaac Ruiz	TKO	2 (6), 1:10	Mar 28, 2008	Municipal Auditorium, Harlingen, Texas, U.S.	
5	Win	4–1	Robbie McClimans	TKO	2 (8), 1:09	Dec 20, 2007	Convention Center, Pasadena, Texas, U.S.	
4	Win	3–1	Brad Bowers	TKO	1 (4), 0:44	Sep 26, 2007	Casa de Amistad, Harlingen, Texas, U.S.	
3	Win	2–1	Ras Thompson	KO	2 (4), 1:28	Aug 10, 2007	Convention Center, McAllen, Texas, U.S.	
2	Win	1–1	Tim Harris	TKO	1 (4), 2:02	Jun 22, 2007	Convention Center, McAllen, Texas, U.S.	
1	Loss	0–1	Ashanti Jordan	KO	1 (4), 1:45	Mar 17, 2007	Mandalay Bay Events Center, Paradise, Nevada, U.S.	

Sporting positions
Regional boxing titles
Vacant Title last held by Robbie McClimans	Texas cruiserweight champion October 18, 2008 – 2010; Vacated	Vacant
Vacant Title last held by Wayne Braithwaite	WBC Latino cruiserweight champion October 10, 2009 – August 2011; Vacated	Vacant Title next held by Yuniel Dorticos
Vacant Title last held by Bermane Stiverne	WBC–USNBC heavyweight champion August 13, 2011 – February 18, 2012	Succeeded by Chris Arreola
Vacant Title last held by Tony Grano	NABF heavyweight champion April 27, 2013 – November 2013; Vacated	Vacant Title next held by Andy Ruiz
Vacant Title last held by Erkan Teper	IBF Inter-Continental heavyweight champion April 2, 2016 – December 10, 2016; Lost bid for world title	Vacant Title next held by Carlos Takam
