= Bermane Stiverne =

Canadian boxer (born 1978)

Personal information
- Nickname: B. Ware
- Nationality: Haitian; Canadian
- Born: November 1, 1978 (age 47) Plaine-du-Nord, Haiti
- Height: 6 ft 2 in (188 cm)
- Weight: Heavyweight

Boxing career
- Reach: 77 in (196 cm)
- Stance: Orthodox

Boxing record
- Total fights: 32
- Wins: 25
- Win by KO: 21
- Losses: 6
- Draws: 1

Bermane Stiverne (born November 1, 1978) is a Haitian-Canadian former professional boxer who competed from 2005 to 2023. He held the World Boxing Council (WBC) heavyweight title from 2014 to 2015.

== Amateur career ==
Stiverne started boxing at the age of 19. As an amateur he won a silver medal in the super heavyweight division at the 2005 National Championships, as well as bronze in the 2003 and 2004 Championships. In international competition he beat Robert Helenius (points) and David Price (knockout). His total amateur record was 49 wins and 10 losses. Stiverne commented about his absence from the Olympics: "In a qualifying tournament in Mexico I met a Mexican fighter in the semi-finals and I was robbed. I knocked him down three times but still they gave him the decision and the place in Olympics." That fighter was Mexican-American George Garcia.

== Professional career ==
=== Early career ===
Stiverne turned professional under promoter Don King, and knocked out his first twelve opponents with his favoured left hook.

In 2007 he lost by TKO to Demetrice King. In January 2011, he fought and knocked out Kertson Manswell in the 2nd round. He won the vacant WBC International, vacant WBC USNBC and vacant WBA Fedelatin heavyweight titles. He fought Ray Austin on June 25, 2011 for the vacant WBC Silver heavyweight title. Stiverne won the fight by a 10-round TKO, becoming the mandatory challenger for the WBC heavyweight championship, then held by Vitali Klitschko.

=== WBC Heavyweight champion ===
==== Stiverne vs. Arreola II ====
On December 19, 2013, the WBC ordered their #1 ranked heavyweight Bermane Stiverne, and their #2 ranked heavyweight Chris Arreola to fight for the world heavyweight championship, which was vacated by Vitali Klitschko in October. The fight was an immediate rematch of their April 27, 2013 bout, which Stiverne won by unanimous decision. The title fight was scheduled for May 10, 2014, and was held at the Galen Center in Los Angeles, California. Despite beating Arreola in their previous meeting, Stiverne entered the bout as a +140 underdog, with a number of media outlets predicting an Arreola win. Stiverne won the rematch by a sixth-round technical knockout. Arreola was caught with a right hand early on in the round, and was unable to defend against the increasing volume of Stiverne, which prompted the referee to wave the fight off. Stiverne became the first Haitian-born boxer to win a world heavyweight championship. He was congratulated by notable Haitians on this accomplishment, including by the President of Haiti, Michel Martelly

==== Stiverne vs. Wilder ====
Stiverne made his first WBC heavyweight title defense against the 2008 Olympic Games bronze medalist Deontay Wilder. The fight was scheduled for January 17, 2015, and was held at the MGM Grand Garden Arena in Las Vegas, NV. Stiverne lost the fight by unanimous decision, with scores of 120–107, 119–108 and 118–109. Stiverne landed just 110 punches over the course of the twelve rounds, while Wilder landed 227 punches. Stiverne was hospitalized with dehydration following his title loss, but was released a few days later.

=== Post title reign ===
==== The cancelled Povetkin vs. Stiverne fight ====
In 2016, the WBC ordered mandatory challenger Alexander Povetkin to fight Stiverne for the interim WBC heavyweight title. On November 11, the WBC were informed that Stiverne had tested positive for the banned substance methylhexaneamine. Stiverne claimed he ingested a supplement without knowing that it contained the banned substance. The WBC took into account that it was Stiverne's first offence when making its ruling and fined him $75,000. Just 20 hours before the fight was to take place, the WBC withdrew its sanction of the fight stating Povetkin had failed a drug test for ostarine. Stiverne declined to fight Povetkin.

==== Stiverne vs. Wilder II ====
On November 4, 2017, Stiverne again fought Wilder for the WBC world heavyweight title. Before the fight he had remained largely inactive with only two bouts in nearly three years. At the time of the fight he was the only man to go twelve rounds with Wilder. The rematch proved to be disappointing as he was knocked unconscious in the first round. Stats showed that he only threw four punches during the entire fight, none of which connected.

==== Stiverne vs. Joyce ====
In 2019, Stiverne faced undefeated British heavyweight contender Joe Joyce (7–0, 7 KOs) on the undercard of Chris Eubank Jr. vs. James DeGale on February 23. Joyce was ranked #5 by the WBA at heavyweight. Joyce opened up by throwing power shots and pressing the opponent. The out of shape, 40 year old Stiverne had some successful counterattacks but stayed passive most of the time. The fight was stopped by the referee in the 6th round, Stiverne losing by TKO.

==== Stiverne vs. Bryan ====
On January 29, 2021, Stiverne faced WBA regular heavyweight champion and #1 WBA ranked heavyweight Trevor Bryan. Bryan managed to drop Stiverne twice, with the referee stopping the fight shortly after the second knockdown, in the middle of round eleven.

== Personal life ==
Stiverne was born in Plaine-du-Nord, Haiti. He is the youngest of 14 children, having eight sisters and five brothers. In July 2011, he volunteered at the Welcome Hall Mission in Montreal, to offer training and inspiration to local homeless youth. Stiverne is known to be a fan of the Miami Heat.

== Professional boxing record ==
32 fights	25 wins	6 losses
By knockout	21	4
By decision	4	2
Draws	1	

No.	Result	Record	Opponent	Type	Round, time	Date	Location	Notes
32	Loss	25–6–1	Jonathan Guidry	UD	10	Jan 21, 2023	Casino Miami, Miami, Florida, U.S.	
31	Loss	25–5–1	Trevor Bryan	TKO	11 (12), 1:26	Jan 29, 2021	Seminole Hard Rock Hotel & Casino, Hollywood, Florida, U.S.	For vacant WBA (Regular) heavyweight title
30	Loss	25–4–1	Joe Joyce	TKO	6 (12), 2:20	Feb 23, 2019	The O2 Arena, London, England	For Commonwealth and inaugural WBA (Gold) heavyweight titles
29	Loss	25–3–1	Deontay Wilder	KO	1 (12), 2:59	Nov 4, 2017	Barclays Center, New York City, New York, U.S.	For WBC heavyweight title
28	Win	25–2–1	Derric Rossy	UD	10	Nov 14, 2015	The Joint, Paradise, Nevada, U.S.	
27	Loss	24–2–1	Deontay Wilder	UD	12	Jan 17, 2015	MGM Grand Garden Arena, Paradise, Nevada, U.S.	Lost WBC heavyweight title
26	Win	24–1–1	Chris Arreola	TKO	6 (12), 2:02	May 10, 2014	Galen Center, Los Angeles, California, U.S.	Won vacant WBC heavyweight title
25	Win	23–1–1	Chris Arreola	UD	12	Apr 27, 2013	Citizens Business Bank Arena, Ontario, California, U.S.	Retained WBC Silver heavyweight title
24	Win	22–1–1	Willie Herring	UD	8	Apr 14, 2012	Jai-Alai Fronton, Miami, Florida, U.S.	
23	Win	21–1–1	Ray Austin	TKO	10 (12), 0:43	Jun 25, 2011	Family Arena, St. Charles, Missouri, U.S.	Won vacant WBC Silver heavyweight title
22	Win	20–1–1	Kertson Manswell	TKO	2 (10), 1:52	Feb 29, 2011	Silverdome, Pontiac, Michigan, U.S.	Won vacant WBA Fedelatin, WBC International, and WBC–USNBC heavyweight titles
21	Win	19–1–1	Ramon Hayes	KO	1 (8), 2:08	Nov 11, 2010	Corona Theatre, Montreal, Quebec, Canada	
20	Win	18–1–1	Jerry Butler	TKO	7 (8), 1:34	Oct 31, 2009	Treasure Island Hotel and Casino, Paradise, Nevada, U.S.	
19	Draw	17–1–1	Charles Davis	MD	6	Apr 29, 2009	Scottrade Center, St. Louis, Missouri, U.S.	
18	Win	17–1	Robert Hawkins	UD	8	Feb 14, 2009	BankAtlantic Center, Sunrise, Florida, U.S.	
17	Win	16–1	Lyle McDowell	KO	1 (8)	Dec 20, 2008	Hallenstadion, Zürich, Switzerland	
16	Win	15–1	Brad Gregory	TKO	1 (8), 2:35	Jul 11, 2008	Uniprix Stadium, Montreal, Quebec, Canada	
15	Win	14–1	Jimmy Haynes	KO	1 (8), 2:08	Mar 27, 2008	Scottrade Center, St. Louis, Missouri, U.S.	
14	Win	13–1	Edward Gutierrez	TKO	1 (8), 2:58	Oct 6, 2007	Madison Square Garden, New York City, New York, U.S.	
13	Loss	12–1	Demetrice King	TKO	4 (8), 1:59	Jul 7, 2007	The Arena at Harbor Yard, Bridgeport, Connecticut, U.S.	
12	Win	12–0	Earl Ladson	KO	3 (8), 2:10	Apr 28, 2007	Foxwoods Resort Casino, Ledyard, Connecticut, U.S.	
11	Win	11–0	John Clark	TKO	1 (6), 2:59	Mar 2, 2007	Belterra Casino Resort & Spa, Florence, Indiana, U.S.	
10	Win	10–0	Harold Sconiers	KO	1 (6), 2:05	Feb 3, 2007	Silver Spurs Arena, Kissimmee, Florida, U.S.	
9	Win	9–0	Otis Mills	TKO	1 (6), 1:48	Jan 6, 2007	Hard Rock Live, Hollywood, Florida, U.S.	
8	Win	8–0	Charles Brown	KO	2 (6), 2:03	Oct 7, 2006	Allstate Arena, Rosemont, Illinois, U.S.	
7	Win	7–0	Franklin Lawrence	TKO	1 (4), 0:57	Jul 8, 2006	Savvis Center, St. Louis, Missouri, U.S.	
6	Win	6–0	Marcus Dear	TKO	3 (4), 2:44	Apr 8, 2006	Thomas & Mack Center, Paradise, Nevada, U.S.	
5	Win	5–0	John Turlington	TKO	1 (4), 2:23	Jan 7, 2006	Madison Square Garden, New York City, New York, U.S.	
4	Win	4–0	James Harrison	TKO	1 (4), 1:16	Dec 1, 2005	The Plex, North Charleston, South Carolina, U.S.	
3	Win	3–0	Gary Lavender	TKO	1 (4), 2:32	Oct 27, 2005	The Plex, North Charleston, South Carolina, U.S.	
2	Win	2–0	Benny Bland	TKO	1 (4), 1:02	Sep 9, 2005	The Frosted Mug, Morgantown, West Virginia, U.S.	
1	Win	1–0	Roy Matthews	TKO	1 (4), 1:26	Jul 29, 2005	The Plex, North Charleston, South Carolina, U.S.	

Sporting positions
Regional boxing titles
Vacant Title last held by Odlanier Solis	WBA Fedelatin heavyweight champion January 29, 2011 – June 2011; Vacated	Vacant Title next held by Luis Ortiz
Vacant Title last held by Odlanier Solis	WBC International heavyweight champion January 29, 2011 – June 25, 2011; Won Silver title	Vacant Title next held by Mariusz Wach
Vacant Title last held by Derric Rossy	WBC–USNBC heavyweight champion January 29, 2011 – June 25, 2011; Won Silver title	Vacant Title next held by Éric Molina
New title	WBC Silver heavyweight champion June 25, 2011 – May 10, 2014; Won world title	Vacant Title next held by Carlos Takam
World boxing titles
Vacant Title last held by Vitali Klitschko	WBC heavyweight champion May 10, 2014 – January 17, 2015	Succeeded by Deontay Wilder
