= Hughie Fury =

British boxer (born 1994)

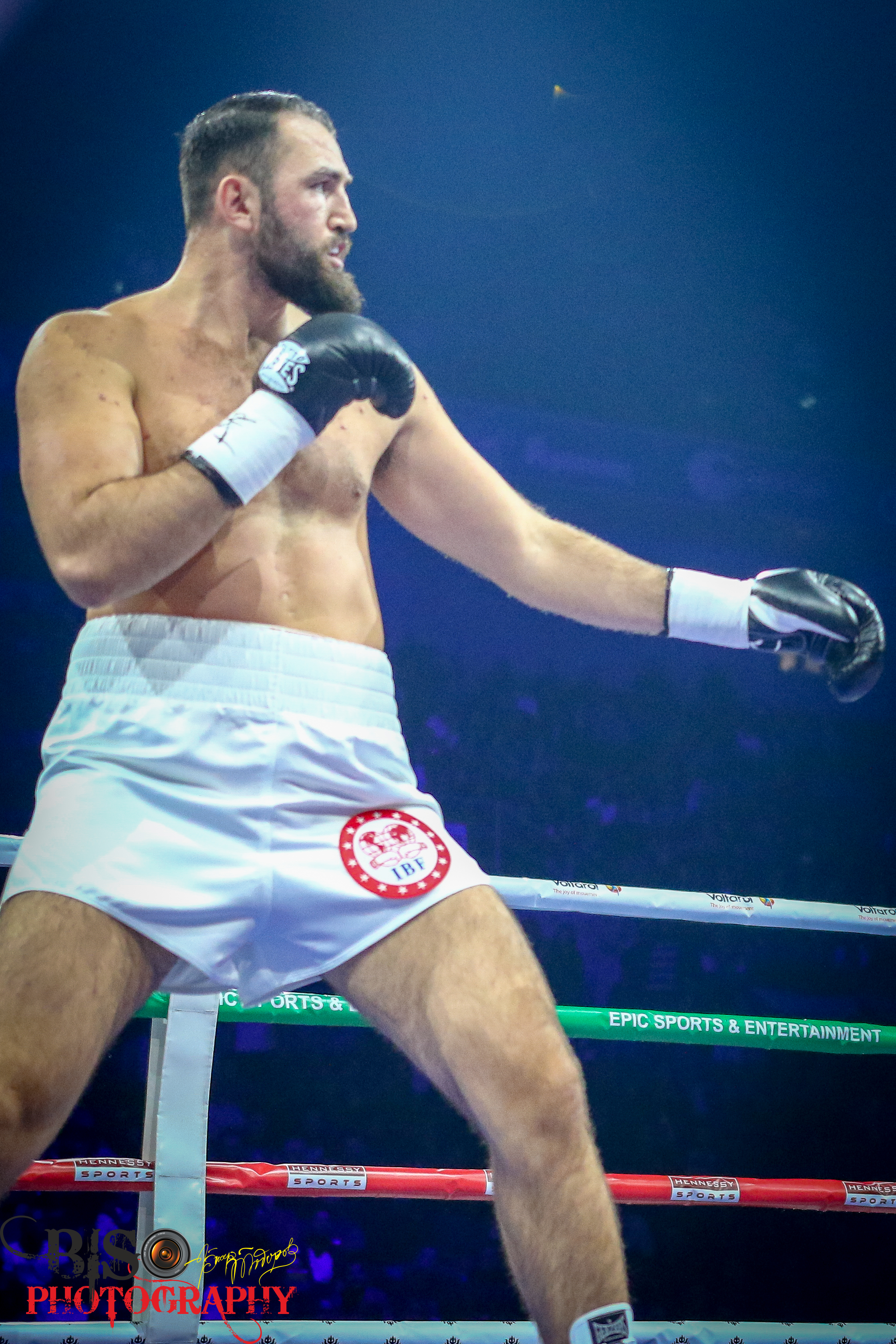
- Fury in 2018

Personal information
- Nickname: The Fist of Fury
- Born: Hughie Lewis Fury; 18 September 1994 (age 32) Stockport, Greater Manchester, England
- Height: 6 ft 6 in (198 cm)
- Weight: Heavyweight

Boxing career
- Reach: 80 in (203 cm)
- Stance: Orthodox

Boxing record
- Total fights: 34
- Wins: 31
- Win by KO: 18
- Losses: 3
Medal record
Men's amateur boxing
Representing England
Youth World Championships
Gold medal – first place	2012 Yerevan	Super-heavyweight

Hughie Lewis Fury (born 18 September 1994) is a British professional boxer. He challenged once for the WBO heavyweight title in 2017. At regional level, held the British heavyweight title in 2018. As an amateur, he won a gold medal at the 2012 Youth World Championships.

== Early life ==
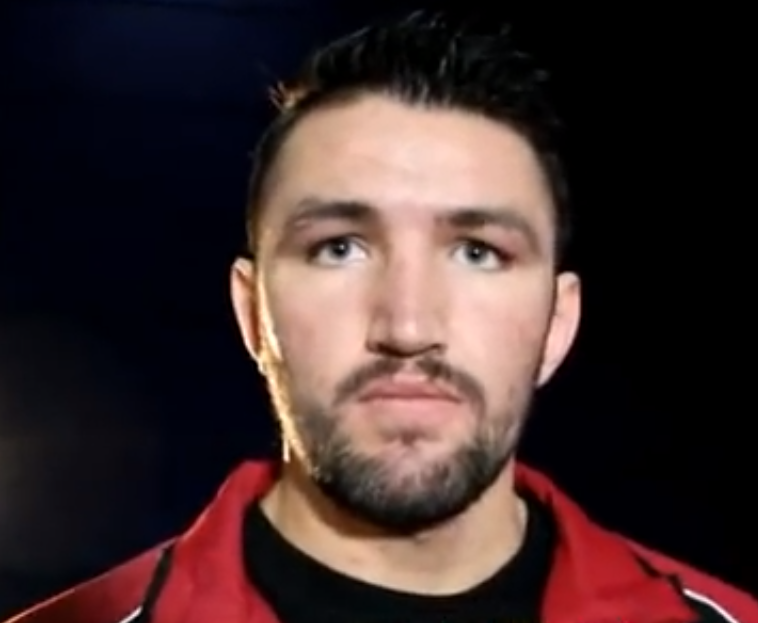
Fury in 2015

Hughie Lewis Fury was born on 18 September 1994 in Stockport, Greater Manchester, England, to a family of Irish Traveller heritage. He is the first cousin of Tyson Fury, both of whom have stated that they are aiming to become "the new Klitschkos" and dominate the heavyweight division. He is also the cousin of heavyweight boxer Nathan Gorman, as well as light heavyweight boxer and former Love Island contestant Tommy Fury. He is trained by his father, Peter Fury. Peter was jailed twice during Hughie's childhood.

== Amateur career ==
In 2012, Hughle Fury represented England at the Youth World Amateur Boxing Championships in Yerevan. Hughie Fury won a gold medal at super-heavyweight and became the first British fighter to win one at that weight class in that event.

== Professional career ==
=== Early career ===
Fury turned professional at the age of 18, the year following his gold medal win at the Youth World Amateur Championships. He fought at the Bell Centre in Montreal on the undercard of Stevenson-Boon II on 22 March 2013, against 34 year old David Whittom in a scheduled four round fight. Fury won via second-round knockout. His second professional bout took place a month later at the Madison Square Garden Theater in New York City on the undercard of his cousin, Tyson Fury's fight against Steve Cunningham. He defeated American Alex Rozman via first round stoppage. Fury fought in the UK for the first time in May at City Hall in Belfast in a points decision win against Ugandan Moses Matovu. Referee John Lowey scored it 40–36 in favour of Fury. Ten days following the points win, Fury travelled to Romania to fight at the Sala Olympia in Timișoara on an unsanctioned show against defeating Janos Finfera. Fury fought twice in June beating Ladislav Kovarik via technical knockout, then beating Tomas Mrazek via a shutout points decision 60–54. Fury fought twice again in July, beating 39 year old Ivica Perkovic, then picking up a points win against Moses Matovu for the second time.

On 14 September, Fury was scheduled in his first 8-round bout at the Magna Centre in Rotherham against 27 year old Shane McPhilbin. The fight ended after round one. McPhilbin claimed to have injured his left shoulder. Fury kept his unbeaten record intact with a 6-round unanimous decision win over Dorian Darch at the York Hall in London. The referee scored it 60–54 for Fury. Fury was next scheduled to fight little known Croatian fighter Hrvoje Kisicek (4–5, 1 KOs) in a scheduled 6 round bout at the Hermitage Leisure Centre in Whitwick. Fury won every round as he cruised to a comfortable points win 60–54. Fury was to return on 8 November in a scheduled 6th round bout at the City Academy Sports Centre in Bristol, against 32-year-old David Gegeshidze (10–4–1, 2 KO's). Fury picked up his 7th stoppage of his career with a hard-fought 4th-round TKO win over Gegeshidze. Fury next fought 36-year-old Matthew Greer and defeated him in the 2nd round of a scheduled 6 round fight at the Copper Box Arena in London. Fury knocked Greer down three times in the 2nd round to get the stoppage.

Fury went the 8 round distance for the first time in his career, winning seven rounds, against Danny Hughes. The referee scored it 79–74. In February 2015, Fury faced off against his toughest opponent to date on paper, Andriy Rudenko (24–1, 16 KOs). Rudenko's only loss came before this fight against Australian contender Lucas Browne via decision. Fury defeated Rudenko in his first ever 10 round fight via unanimous decision on the Golovkin-Murray fight card at the Salle des Étoiles in Monte Carlo, Monaco. The final judges' scores were 98–92, 98–91, and 97–92 all in favour of Fury.

Fury took five months off before returning in July at the Derby Arena in Derby against 41 year old veteran and former Brazilian heavyweight champion George Arias, who had won 56 of 68 pro fights since 1996. Fury remained unbeaten with a points decision win over former world cruiserweight title challenger Arias. The referee scored the fight 100–90, in what was called a dreadful mismatch. In November, Fury fought Argentine Emilio Ezequiel Zarate (18–14–3, 9 KOs) at the City Academy Sports Centre in Bristol. Fury picked up his 9th knockout of his career in stopping journeyman Zarate in the 2nd round of the scheduled eight round bout. Fury hit Zarate with a right hand to the left side of his head, causing him to fall down face first on the canvas.

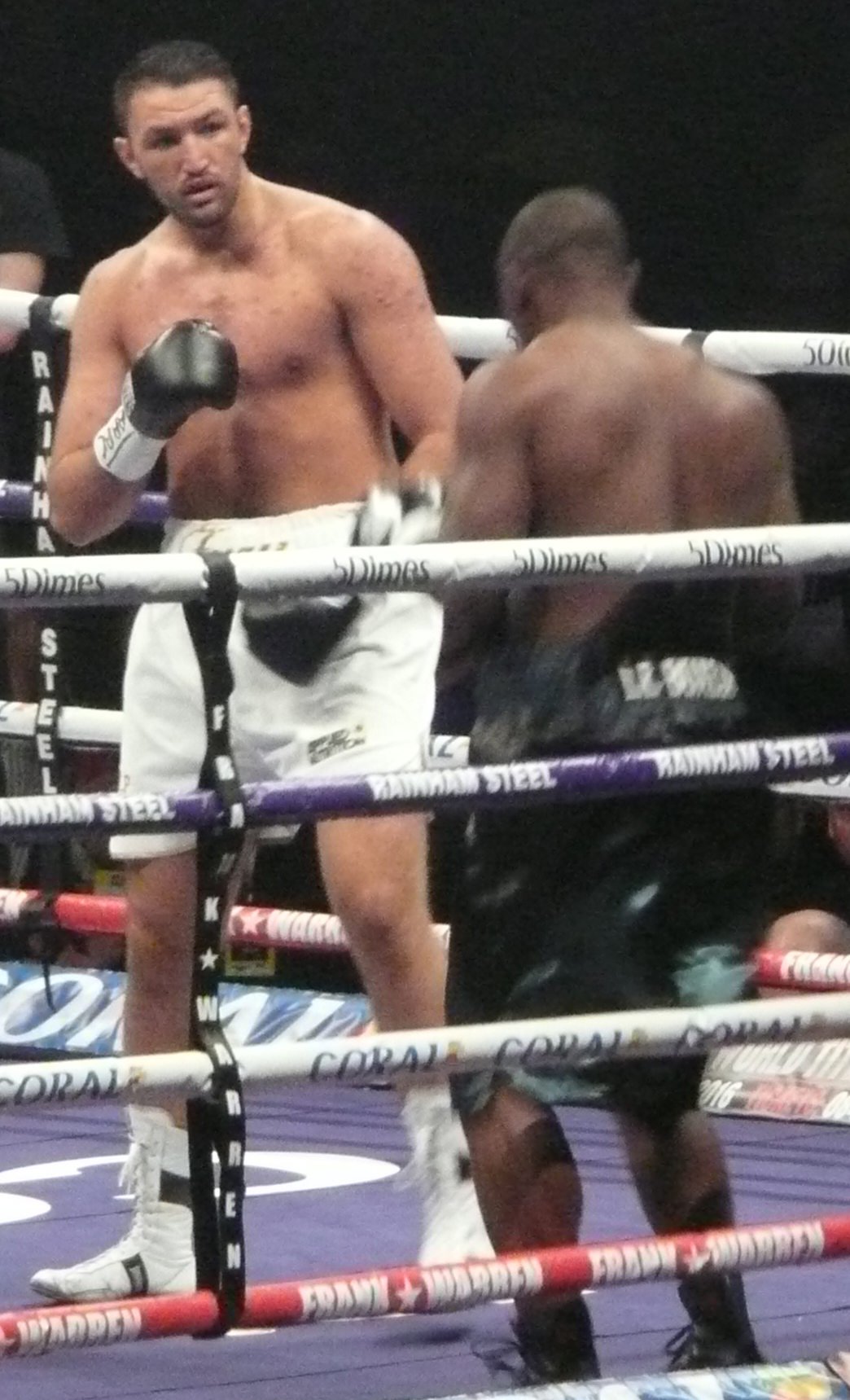
Fury vs. Fred Kassi, 2016

Fury fought 37 year old Larry Olubamiwo in an 8-round fight, defeating him via first round stoppage under 2 minutes in round one. There was rumours after the fight claiming Fury turned down a chance to fight WBC champion Deontay Wilder worth big money on 16 January. However, Peter Fury stated that Hughie would be in a big fight next year before a shot at the WBC title. Fury fought in March 2016 outpointing 40 year old American boxer Dominick Guinn in a 10-round decision at the Wembley Arena in London. Referee Terry O'Connor scored it 100–90 for Fury. It was announced on 13 April 2016 that Billy Joe Saunders had sustained an injury and would not take part on the card on 30 April, thus moving Fury's fight with journeyman Fred Kassi (18–4–1, 10 KOs) as the headliner at the Copper Box Arena. In his first title bout, Fury claimed the vacant WBO Inter-Continental heavyweight title by outpointing Kassi via technical decision. The bout went to the scorecards after seven rounds following an accidental clash of heads which left Fury with a gash over his left eye. Fury was heavily booed throughout the fight. Fury was ahead on all judges' scorecards by a comfortable margin 69–66, 70–64, and 69–65. Fury extended his unbeaten run to 20 wins and no losses since turning pro in 2013.

==== Health conditions ====
In May 2016, Peter Fury claimed that Hughie was operating only at 30 or 40 percent because of an ongoing skin condition causing fatigue and affecting the immune system. The British Boxing Board of Control ordered Fury to face Dillian Whyte for the British title. Fury had been fighting these health issues since January 2015. After a few months of treatment, Peter stated he was keen to get Hughie in the ring with IBF champion Anthony Joshua by November 2016. In January 2017, Fury spoke about the acne and health issues he had over the years and how he battled to overcome them:

"I went to a skin specialist and he said: 'I can't believe you have been fighting in this condition'. He took blood tests. He told me the bad infected blood basically poisons the insides, affects your immune system and you are always fatigued. The type of acne I had, in the olden days they used to bring them in and put them in hospital beds. That's how bad it was. I never had one good training camp, about three weeks before a fight I would have to stop doing anything to get my strength back. (...) I've had it since I was 15. I thought it was teenage acne so it never really bothered me, but then it kept getting worse. Before I fought Fred Kassi I had cold sores all around my mouth."

=== Career from 2017–2018 ===
==== Fury vs. Parker ====
In December 2016, following Joseph Parker's WBO heavyweight title victory, Fury, ranked number 2 by the WBO, was in contention to fight him next. David Haye, ranked number 1 by the WBO, decided to take up a pay-per-view grudge fight with fellow Brit Tony Bellew, pushing Fury to the spot of mandatory challenger. Fury wanted the fight to take place in the UK whilst Parker preferred it to be in New Zealand. On 25 January 2017, the WBO ordered a purse bid to take place on 1 February, with a minimum bid of $1 million. Parker would receive the higher amount of the 60/40 split. A deal was close to being reached before the WBO ordered the purse bid. One day before the scheduled purse bids, the WBO pushed it back by two days, to take place on 3 February instead.

Duco Events, representing Parker made a winning bid of $3,011,000 to secure promotional rights of the fight. This would ensure both fighters to receive their career high purses with Parker earning $1,806,600 and Fury earning $1,204,400. Frank Warren, representing Fury, who made a bid of $2,800,000, wanted the fight to take place in the UK. Duco announced a date was set for 1 April 2017 in Auckland, New Zealand. Because no deal was signed, on 22 February, WBO president Paco Valcarcel made team Fury aware that they had until 23 February to agree the terms of the fight. If they did not comply, the WBO would then order Parker to follow through and make a voluntary defence.

On 8 March, Dave Higgins from Duco Events confirmed the bout would take place at the Vector Arena in New Zealand on 6 May 2017. The reason behind the location was that Parker enjoys fighting in front of his Kiwi fans. On 22 March 2017, Peter Fury was denied a VISA entry into New Zealand. This was due to his criminal past, dating back to the 1990s when he was incarcerated for 10 years for drug related offences. Two days later, Peter was granted a special VISA running from 28 March to 10 May 2017 meaning he would have over a month to prepare Hughie for the title challenge.

On 22 April 2017, WBO president Paco Valcarcel announced that the fight was off and would not be taking place. In the released statement, it was claimed that the cancellation came from Fury although nothing was confirmed. Parker's camp were said to be disappointed but not surprised by this. The WBO told Duco Events that they can schedule another fight with an opponent within the top 15 WBO rankings. Fury issued a statement,

"It is with our deepest regret that we have to announce that the WBO World Heavyweight Championship between the Champion, Joseph Parker, and mandatory challenger, Hughie Fury, scheduled for Saturday 6th May 2017 in Auckland, New Zealand, has been postponed. Hughie has been declared medically unfit to box following a medical assessment. He has suffered an injury to his lower back which has been a serious issue for the last three weeks that has left him unable to train to his full capacity. Despite receiving intense physiotherapy treatment and his desire to fight for the WBO World title, after seeing his physiotherapist last Friday he has been advised to rest for 3–4 weeks before resuming training."

— Team Fury

Peter Fury later stated that he wanted to reschedule the fight as soon as possible. Fury later released a statement revealing Parker's promoters had been trying to switch the location of the fight to England because of money issues. They also were adamant Hughie was injured and wanted the world championship fight with Parker rescheduled. Peter Fury said his injury was a recurrence of an injury he suffered a year prior and had flared up again during an intense sparring session.

On 9 June 2017, Peter Fury confirmed that the fight would now take place at the Manchester Arena in Manchester on 23 September. He also said that Fury would have a tune-up fight at the Copper Box Arena on 8 July and then a week later on 15 July at the Winter Gardens in Blackpool. The WBO blocked Fury from taking part in a warm-up fight at the Copper Box because as per WBO rules, once a mandatory challenger agrees to fight the world champion, he cannot participate in a professional fight before then. Warren said Fury would still fight, but in an exhibition, which would not count on his professional record. Fury took part and won a six-round exhibition against UK-based Polish boxer Kamil Sokolowski (4–10–2, 1 KOs) at the Copper Box on 8 July. With five days out from the fight, The British Boxing Board of Control had appointed British referee Terry O'Connor, the same official in charge of Fury's last two bouts. It saw Peter Fury exchanging a foul-mouthed argument with David Higgins at the final press conference in London, that started off with Higgins approaching Fury, unhappy with the appointment of British referee O'Connor for the fight. Higgins was then ejected from the press conference by security officials. Overall Higgins' outburst caused a referee change after it began to create noise and headlines. As of 21 September, only 5,000 tickets had been sold since the start of the week. Hennessy was hoping to have a crowd of at least 8,000 at the arena, which has a capacity of 21,000.

Fury failed to capture his first world title after he was outworked by Parker. The fight went the 12 round distance, with two judges scoring the fight 118–110 in favour of Parker and the third judge had it 114–114, giving Parker the win via majority decision. Parker showed Fury respect throughout the fight, having to get through Fury's jab in order to land anything. The opening six rounds saw Fury flicking his jab in to thin air, which caused Parker to think twice before going on the attack. Parker started finding his shots in the latter half. Parker finished strongly in the last two rounds as Fury started showing signs of fatigue. In the post-fight interview, Parker said, "I felt the aggression was good on my side. He was really awkward and his movement was good, but I caught him with the harder punches I felt." Fury was paid £750,000 while Parker took home £1.1 million.

Promoter Mick Hennessy, as with the rest of the Fury camp, was disgusted with the wide scorecards, "This is corruption at its highest level in boxing. I thought it was an absolute masterclass, shades of Ali. Parker wasn't even in the fight. One of the worst decisions I've ever seen." He said he would be appealing the decision. WBO vice-president John Duggan backed the decision to have Parker as the winner. He made it clear that the result would not be investigated or overturned.

==== Fury vs. Sexton ====
On 14 February 2018, Hennessy Sports along with Infinitum announced that Fury would challenge Sam Sexton for his British heavyweight title at Macron Stadium's Premier Suite in Bolton on 12 May, live and exclusive on Channel 5. The bout would mark the first time in nearly seven years that the British title would be contested for on terrestrial TV. Speaking of the fight, Mick Hennessy said, "I'm delighted to bring the historic British Heavyweight Championship back to mainstream, free-to-air, television on Channel 5 where it will be seen by the biggest viewing audience possible due to their considerable reach and exposure. I can't believe that it will be nearly seven years since the British Heavyweight title was last seen on free-to-air in the UK on Channel 5." Sexton would make his first defence of the title, which he won defeating Gary Cornish in October 2017. The title was vacant at the time. Fury started the fight moving around the ring throwing jabs and right hands. The movement looked to frustrate Sexton in round 3. Fury knocked Sexton down twice in the fight in dropping him in rounds 4 and 5. Fury won the British title defeating Sexton via TKO in round 5; Referee Terry O'Connor stopped the fight after Fury knocked Sexton down with a right hand in round 5. Sexton got back to his feet, but the referee stopped it anyway. After the bout it was said that Fury was expected to vacate the title and move forward to get into a mandatory position for a world title. The fight peaked at 2.9 million viewers.

==== Fury vs. Pulev ====
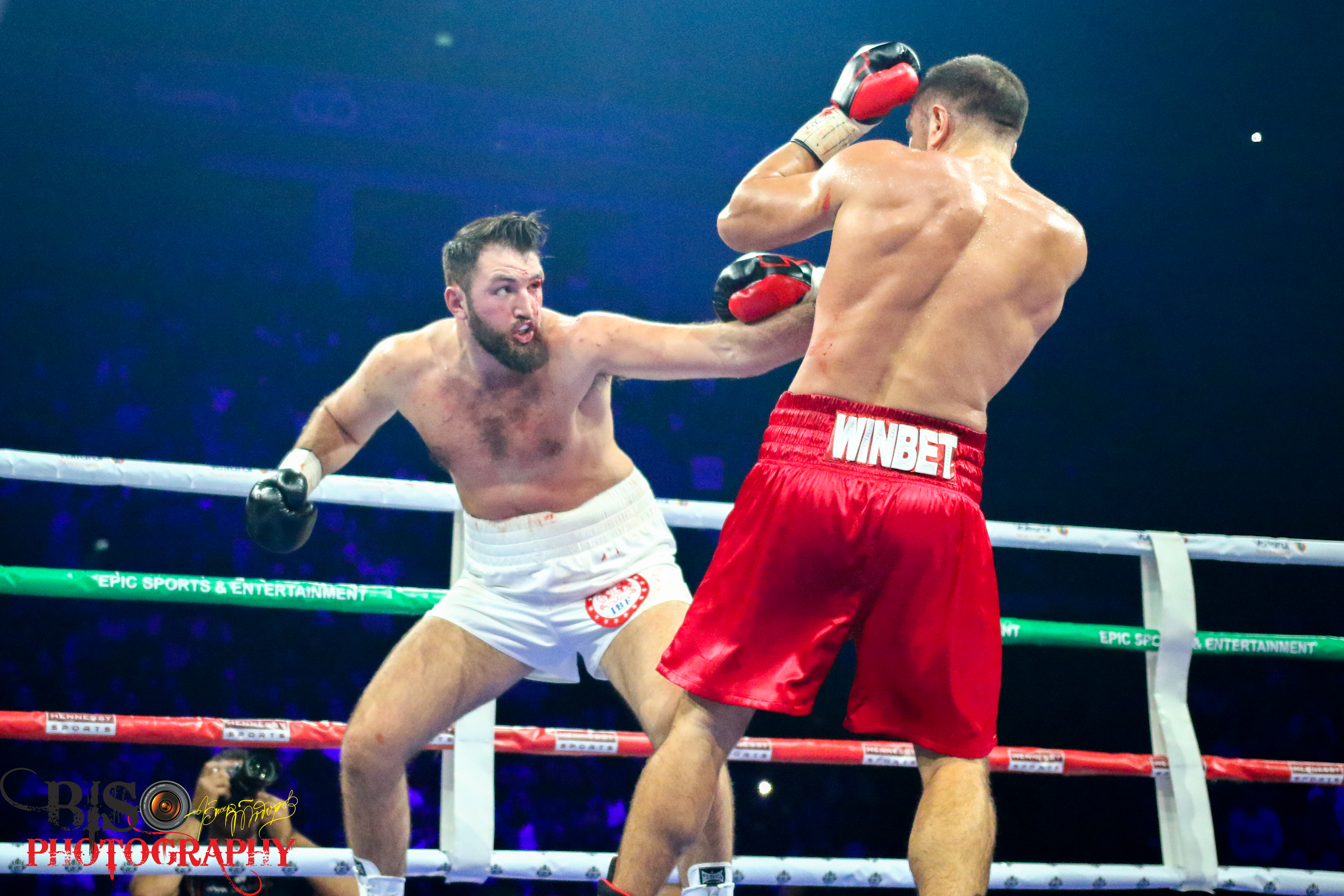
Fury (left) vs. Pulev, 2018

In March 2018, the IBF ordered Kubrat Pulev vs. Dominic Breazeale for a final eliminator, however Breazeale refused to take part. In April, the IBF ordered Pulev to fight British boxer Dillian Whyte (23–1, 17 KOs). On 7 June, Whyte pulled out of the fight and instead Matchroom announced he would be fighting former WBO champion Joseph Parker in London on 28 July. On 16 June, the IBF then ordered Pulev against their #3 ranked American boxer Jarrell Miller 21–0, 18 KOs). Negotiations between Pulev and Miller broke down on 10 July.

At the time, the next highest challenger was Fury, who was inserted at #5 by the IBF in June. The IBF ordered a purse bid between the teams of Fury and Pulev to take place on 9 August. On the morning, the IBF pushed the date of the bid to 16 August. However, on that same date, the fight was agreed from both parties and was announced to take place in Sofia, Bulgaria on 27 October 2018.

Pulev defeated Fury via a 12-round unanimous decision to become the mandatory challenger for IBF heavyweight title. The scores were 117–111, 118–110, and 115–113. After a good start by Fury, he could not overcome a cut that opened up in round 2, which altered his mindset and game plan. Fury had suffered the cut over his left eye during training camp and Pulev took advantage by opening it up again. With the cut bleeding badly, it forced Hughie to fight more aggressively but cautiously. After the fight, Peter Fury said, "Hughie came into the fight with a cut above the eye. He was stitched up two weeks ago but they [the doctors] said it would heal in time for the fight and obviously it didn't." He praised Fury for his efforts after the cut was open. Pulev used his jab often, until round 4, he started unloading on more power shots. Fury spent the majority of the second half of the fight trying to counter Pulev, however was unable to land any meaningful shot. As the fight went on, Pulev's jab became much stronger and accurate, although Pulev was caught with a right hand in round 8. Pulev clinched after being wobbled and took back control in round 9. By round 11, Fury seemed tired and spent most of the final two rounds boxing with his back against the ropes. Fury believed the cut was what ultimately lost him the fight.

=== Career from 2019–2021 ===
On 22 March 2019, Fury vacated the British heavyweight title citing injury. This came after Fury was ordered to fight mandatory challenger Joe Joyce in October 2018.

==== Fury vs. Norrad ====
On 9 April 2019, Hennessy Sports announced Fury would make his ring return on 25 May 2019 at the Victoria Warehouse in Manchester, live on free-to-air Channel 5. Fury dominated Chris Norrad and dropped him in the second round. Norrad barely beat the count, but the referee had seen enough and waved the fight off.

==== Fury vs. Peter ====
On 12 July 2019, Fury faced former WBC champion Samuel Peter. Fury dominated almost every segment of the fight, which culminated in Peter withdrawing from the fight, midway through the seventh round, due to a shoulder injury.

==== Fury vs. Povetkin ====
On 31 August 2019, Fury, ranked #7 by the WBC and #10 by the WBA, fought former WBA (Regular) champion Alexander Povetkin, who was ranked #13 by the IBF. Fury had some success early in the fight, but once Povetkin started landing his right hand Fury's advantages faded away. Povetkin won widely on the scorecards, 117–111 on all three of them. The result was overturned after Povetkin tested positive for Ostarine.

==== Fury vs. Sour ====
On 7 March 2020, Fury stopped Pavel Sour inside three rounds at the Manchester Arena to improve to 24–3.

==== Fury vs. Wach ====
Fury faced former world title challenger Mariusz Wach on the Anthony Joshua vs. Kubrat Pulev undercard on 12 December 2020. Despite suffering a nasty gash over his left eye due to a clash of heads in the fourth round, Fury prevailed via unanimous decision, with judges' scores of 100–90 twice and 99–91 in his favour.

==== Fury vs. Hammer ====
On 16 October 2021, Fury defeated Christian Hammer when the latter retired in his corner after five rounds.

=== Career from 2022 ===
==== Ongoing health issue ====
Fury has been unable to fight for over a year due to health issues. A match with Michael Hunter, originally due for early July 2022, was rescheduled to 29 October. In early October he issued a statement withdrawing from the fight saying he had been advised by doctors to take total rest, that he felt "weak with no strength" and was taking time away for the rest of the year.

==== New promoter ====
Fury signed a multi-fight promotional contract with Izzy Asif's GBM Sports in February 2025.

His first fight under their banner saw him stop Dan Garber in the fifth round of a scheduled six-round bout at York Hall in London on 4 April 2025.

Fury was due to face Michael Pirotton at the Connexin Live Arena in Hull on 28 June 2025, but the fight was cancelled when a British Boxing Board of Control appointed doctor ruled a hand injury which Fury suffered in his previous contest had not healed sufficiently.

== Professional boxing record ==
34 fights	31 wins	3 losses
By knockout	18	0
By decision	13	3

No.	Result	Record	Opponent	Type	Round, time	Date	Location	Notes
34	Win	31–3	Michael Webster	RTD	1(8), 3:00	29 Nov 2025	Sportcomplex De Wilgenring, Rotterdam	
33	Win	30–3	Dan Garber	TKO	5 (6), 1:12	4 Apr 2025	York Hall, London, England	
32	Win	29–3	Christian Thun	PTS	8	27 Sep 2024	Park Community Arena, Sheffield, England	
31	Win	28–3	Patrick Korte	TKO	2 (8), 2:06	11 May 2024	Cardiff International Arena, Cardiff, Wales	
30	Win	27–3	Kostiantyn Dovbyshchenko	PTS	6	20 Apr 2024	Magna Science Adventure Centre, Rotherham, England	
29	Win	26–3	Christian Hammer	RTD	5 (10), 3:00	16 Oct 2021	Utilita Arena Newcastle, Newcastle, England	
28	Win	25–3	Mariusz Wach	UD	10	12 Dec 2020	The SSE Arena Wembley, London, England	
27	Win	24–3	Pavel Sour	TKO	3 (10), 0:24	7 Mar 2020	Manchester Arena, Manchester, England	
26	Loss	23–3	Alexander Povetkin	UD	12	31 Aug 2019	The O2 Arena, London, England	For vacant WBA International heavyweight title
25	Win	23–2	Samuel Peter	TKO	7 (12), 2:11	12 Jul 2019	King Abdullah Sports City, Jeddah, Saudi Arabia	
24	Win	22–2	Chris Norrad	KO	2 (10), 1:51	25 May 2019	Victoria Warehouse, Manchester, England	
23	Loss	21–2	Kubrat Pulev	UD	12	27 Oct 2018	Arena Armeec, Sofia, Bulgaria	
22	Win	21–1	Sam Sexton	TKO	5 (12), 2:03	12 May 2018	Whites Hotel, Bolton, England	Won British heavyweight title
21	Loss	20–1	Joseph Parker	MD	12	23 Sep 2017	Manchester Arena, Manchester, England	For WBO heavyweight title
20	Win	20–0	Fred Kassi	TD	7 (12), 0:46	30 Apr 2016	Copper Box Arena, London, England	Won vacant WBO Inter-Continental heavyweight title; Unanimous TD: Fury cut from an accidental head clash
19	Win	19–0	Dominick Guinn	PTS	10	26 Mar 2016	Wembley Arena, London, England	
18	Win	18–0	Larry Olubamiwo	TKO	1 (8), 1:46	5 Dec 2015	Westcroft Leisure Centre, Carshalton, England	
17	Win	17–0	Emilio Zarate	KO	2 (10), 1:05	14 Nov 2015	City Academy Sports Centre, Bristol, England	
16	Win	16–0	George Arias	PTS	10	25 Jul 2015	Derby Arena, Derby, England	
15	Win	15–0	Andriy Rudenko	UD	10	21 Feb 2015	Salle des Etoiles, Monte Carlo, Monaco	
14	Win	14–0	Danny Hughes	PTS	8	10 May 2014	Ponds Forge, Sheffield, England	
13	Win	13–0	Matthew Greer	TKO	2 (6), 2:37	15 Feb 2014	Copper Box Arena, London, England	
12	Win	12–0	David Gegeshidze	TKO	4 (8), 2:14	8 Nov 2013	City Academy Sports Centre, Bristol, England	
11	Win	11–0	Hrvoje Kisicek	PTS	6	13 Oct 2013	Hermitage Leisure Centre, Whitwick, England	
10	Win	10–0	Dorian Darch	PTS	6	29 Sep 2013	York Hall, London, England	
9	Win	9–0	Shane McPhilbin	RTD	1 (8), 3:00	14 Sep 2013	Magna Science Adventure Centre, Rotherham, England	
8	Win	8–0	Moses Matovu	PTS	4	21 Jul 2013	WonderWorld Xscape, Milton Keynes, England	
7	Win	7–0	Ivica Perkovic	RTD	5 (6), 3:00	12 Jul 2013	Fairways Hotel, Dundalk, Ireland	
6	Win	6–0	Tomas Mrazek	PTS	6	15 Jun 2013	Epic Centre, Norwich, England	
5	Win	5–0	Ladislav Kovarik	TKO	1 (4), 1:37	8 Jun 2013	Bluewater, Stone, England	
4	Win	4–0	Janos Finfera	TKO	2 (4)	24 May 2013	Sala Olimpia, Timișoara, Romania	
3	Win	3–0	Moses Matovu	PTS	4	14 May 2013	City Hall, Belfast, Northern Ireland	
2	Win	2–0	Alex Rozman	TKO	1 (4), 2:26	20 Apr 2013	The Theater at Madison Square Garden, New York City, New York, US	
1	Win	1–0	David Whittom	TKO	2 (4), 1:49	22 Mar 2013	Bell Centre, Montreal, Canada	

== Exhibition boxing record ==
1 fight	wins	losses
Non-scored	1	

No.	Result	Record	Opponent	Type	Round, time	Date	Location	Notes
1	—N/a	0–0 (1)	Kamil Sokolowski	—N/a	6	8 Jul 2017	Copper Box Arena, London, England	Non-scored bout

== Viewership ==
=== United Kingdom ===
Date	Fight	Network	Country	Viewers	Source(s)
12 May 2018	Sam Sexton vs. Hughie Fury	Channel 5	United Kingdom	2,900,000	
Total viewership				2,900,000	

Sporting positions
Regional boxing titles
Vacant Title last held by Andrey Fedosov	WBO Inter-Continental heavyweight champion 30 April 2016 – April 2017; Vacated	Vacant Title next held by Tom Schwarz
Preceded by Sam Sexton	British heavyweight champion 12 May 2018 – 22 March 2019; Vacated	Vacant Title next held by Daniel Dubois
