= Izu Ugonoh =

Polish boxer and MMA fighter (born 1986)

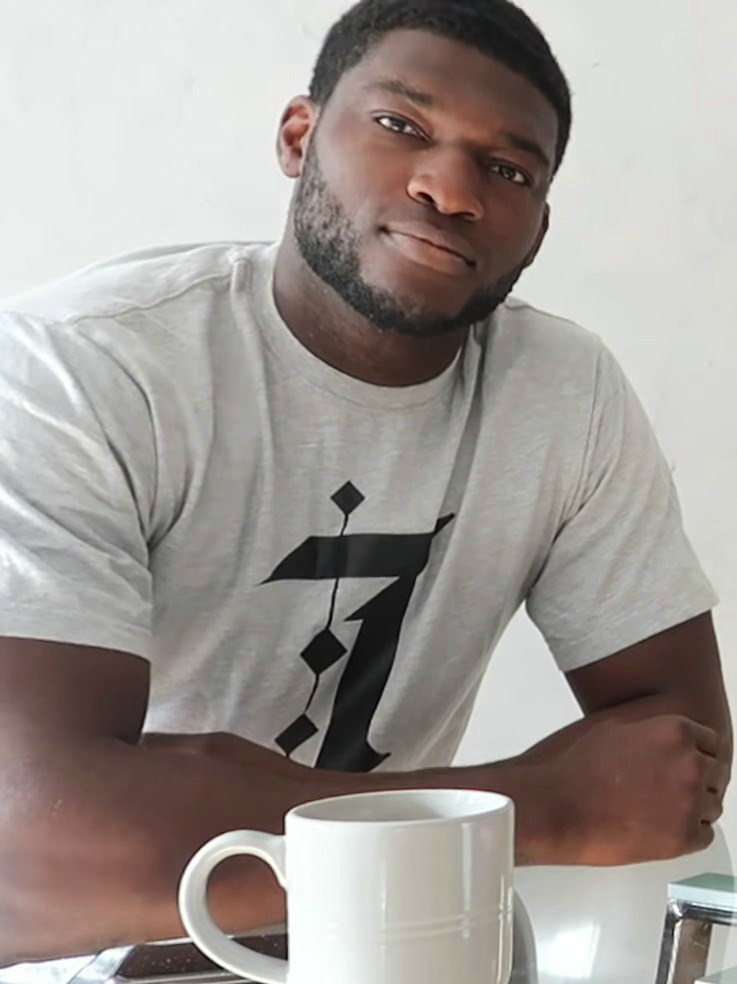
- Ugonoh in 2018
- Born: 2 November 1986 (age 40); Szczecin, Poland
- Nationality: Polish-Nigerian
- Height: 1.96 m (6 ft 5 in)
- Weight: 105.3 kg (232 lb; 16.58 st)
- Division: Cruiserweight; Heavyweight; Heavyweight (MMA)
- Reach: 213 cm (84 in)
- Style: Boxing
- Fighting out of: Warsaw, Poland
- Team: Berkut WCA Fight Team
- Years active: 2010–2019 (boxing); 2020–present (MMA)

Professional boxing record
- Total: 20
- Wins: 18
- By knockout: 15
- Losses: 2

Mixed martial arts record
- Total: 3
- Wins: 1
- By knockout: 1
- Losses: 2
- By knockout: 2

Other information
- Boxing record from BoxRec
- Mixed martial arts record from Sherdog

Izuagbe Ugonoh (born 2 November 1986) is a Polish mixed martial artist and former professional boxer and kickboxer. He is a graduate of the Jędrzej Śniadecki University School of Physical Education and Sport in Gdańsk.

== Early life ==
Izuagbe was born to Nigerian parents in the Polish city of Szczecin. He graduated from the Jędrzej Śniadecki University School of Physical Educations and Sport in Gdańsk.

== Kickboxing career ==
He trained kick boxing at Gdańsk club GKSK Corpus. Due to his similarity in appearance and fighting style he is sometimes called the Polish Remy Bonjasky. He has also been inspired by Gökhan Saki.

In 2009, in the Austrian city of Villach, he won the Kickboxing World Championships gold medal in K-1 Rules to 91 kg, defeating Vladimir Mineev. In 2010, he became European champion in the same formula in Baku. He met the local Zamig Athakishiyev in the final.

== Professional boxing career ==
=== Early career ===
On 16 October 2010, he made his professional debut as a boxer in Legionowo, beating Igoris Papunia from Lithuania by first-round knockout. He fought his second professional fight on 20 November 2010, in a show in Nysa, during which he defeated Pavel Habra by technical KO in the first round. Ugonoh's first fight of 2011 was against Rad Rashid on the 2 April. Ugonoh won the bout by unanimous decision over four rounds. Ugonoh went on to gain five stoppage wins by the end of 2012. He fought once in 2013, defeating Lukasz Rusiewicz by unanimous decision in a six-round bout. In 2014, Ugonoh started training under Kevin Barry while being signed to Duco Events, and became a regular sparring partner for Joseph Parker. Ugonoh also fought once in 2014 knocking out Junior Maletino Lakopo in two rounds.

Ugonoh next fought on the 5 March 2015, against Thomas Peato. Ugonoh won the bout by second-round knockout. He went on to gain wins over Julius Long and Will Quarrie before facing Ibrahim Labaran for the interim WBA Oceania and WBO Africa heavyweight titles. Ugonoh won the fight by first-round knockout. He also got a first-round knockout win against Vicente Sandez in December 2015. Ugonoh's first fight of 2016 was against Ricardo Humberto Ramirez, which he won by knockout in the fourth round. Ugonoh next fought on the 1 October, knocking out Gregory Tony in two rounds to pick up the vacant IBF Mediterranean heavyweight title. In December 2016, Ugonoh left his promoter Duco Events David Higgins after being with them for two years. Ugonoh shortly signed with Al Haymon after his departure from Duco.

==== Ugonoh vs. Breazeale ====
On the 25 February 2017, Ugonoh faced former world title challenger Dominic Breazeale on the under card of Deontay Wilder vs Gerald Washington, in Birmingham, Alabama, USA. Breazeale was ranked #11 by the WBC at heavyweight at the time. Ugonoh was ranked 7th in WBO and 9th in IBF. In a back and forth fight which saw both men hit the canvas, Breazeale came out on top after he dropped Ugonoh through the ropes in the fifth round. The fights' third round won the round of the year from The Ring Magazine. This was the last fight Ugonoh fought under his trainer Kevin Barry.

=== Career from 2018 ===
After losing to Breazeale in 2017, Ugonoh next returned to the ring on the 25 May 2018.

==== Ugonoh vs. Kassi ====
Ugonoh faced Fred Kassi in a ten-round bout, winning the fight by stoppage after Kassi was retired on his stool at the end of the second round.

== Mixed martial arts career ==
On July 11, 2020, news surfaced that Ugonoh transitioned from boxing to mixed martial arts and had signed a contract with Konfrontacja Sztuk Walki. He made his mixed martial arts debut at KSW 54 on August 29, 2020. In his first fight he defeated Quentin Domingos.

Ugonoh was scheduled to make his sophomore MMA appearance against the undefeated heavyweight prospect Thomas Narmo at KSW 60, but Narmo was forced off the card on March 6 with an rib injury. The undefeated German Uğur Özkaplan served as Narmo's replacement. In turn, Özkaplan was replaced by Marek Samociuk. He lost the bout via TKO in the second round after gassing in the first round.

Ugonoh rematched with Marek Samociuk at KSW 70 on May 28, 2022. He lost the bout again, losing via TKO stoppage due to ground and pound in the first round.

== Personal life ==
Ugonoh also played a wrestling cameo in the Polish movie Afonia and the bees (2009) directed by Jan Jakub Kolski.

He calls himself a "black Pole" and says that he proudly represents Poland on the international arena. He often jokes that when he looks into a mirror, he "doesn't know what happened", referring to his skin color as atypical for ethnic Poles, a white ethnic group.

His sister, Osuenhe "Osi" Ugonoh, works as a professional model, and is known for winning Poland's 4th edition of Top Model reality television series in 2014.

== Professional boxing record ==
20 fights	18 wins	2 losses
By knockout	15	2
By decision	3	0

No.	Result	Record	Opponent	Type	Round, time	Date	Location	Notes
20	Loss	18–2	Łukasz Różański	KO	4 (10), 2:27	6 Jul 2019	Stadion Miejski, Rzeszów, Poland	
19	Win	18–1	Fred Kassi	RTD	2 (10), 3:00	25 May 2018	Stadion Narodowy, Warsaw, Poland	
18	Loss	17–1	Dominic Breazeale	TKO	5 (10), 0:50	25 Feb 2017	Legacy Arena, Birmingham, Alabama, US	
17	Win	17–0	Grégory Tony	TKO	2 (10), 2:26	1 Oct 2016	Vodafone Events Centre, Auckland, New Zealand	Won vacant IBF Mediterranean heavyweight title
16	Win	16–0	Ricardo Humberto Ramírez	KO	4 (10), 1:47	21 Jul 2016	Horncastle Arena, Christchurch, New Zealand	Retained WBO Africa heavyweight title
15	Win	15–0	Vicente Sandez	KO	1 (10), 1:11	5 Dec 2015	Claudelands Arena, Hamilton, New Zealand	Retained interim WBO Africa heavyweight title
14	Win	14–0	Ibrahim Labaran	TKO	1 (10), 2:38	15 Oct 2015	Trusts Stadium, Auckland, New Zealand	Won interim WBA Oceania & WBO Africa heavyweight titles
13	Win	13–0	Will Quarrie	KO	2 (10), 2:14	1 Aug 2015	Stadium Southland, Invercargill, New Zealand	
12	Win	12–0	Julius Long	UD	8	13 Jun 2015	Arena Manawatu, Palmerston North, New Zealand	
11	Win	11–0	Thomas Peato	TKO	2 (6), 1:15	5 Mar 2015	Vodafone Events Centre, Auckland, New Zealand	
10	Win	10–0	Junior Maletino Iakopo	TKO	2 (6), 1:04	16 Oct 2014	Trusts Stadium, Auckland, New Zealand	
9	Win	9–0	Lukasz Rusiewicz	UD	6	23 Feb 2013	Ergo Arena, Gdańsk, Poland	
8	Win	8–0	Mathieu Monnier	TKO	5 (6)	8 Dec 2012	Spodek, Katowice, Poland	
7	Win	7–0	Björn Blaschke	TKO	6 (6), 1:05	17 Mar 2012	MOSiR Ice Rink, Krynica-Zdrój, Poland	
6	Win	6–0	Florians Strupits	TKO	1 (6), 1:50	3 Dec 2011	Hilton Warsaw Hotel, Warsaw, Poland	
5	Win	5–0	Fatih Ceyhan	RTD	3 (4), 3:00	12 Nov 2011	Gdynia Sports Arena, Gdynia, Poland	
4	Win	4–0	Patrick Berger	TKO	2 (4), 2:08	15 Oct 2011	Spodek, Katowice, Poland	
3	Win	3–0	Rashid Raad	UD	4	2 Apr 2011	Łuczniczka, Bydgoszcz, Poland	
2	Win	2–0	Pavel Habr	TKO	1 (4), 2:47	20 Nov 2010	AZS PWSZ Nysa, Nysa, Poland	
1	Win	1–0	Igor Papunia	KO	1 (4), 1:29	16 Oct 2010	Arena Legionowo, Legionowo, Poland	

== Mixed martial arts record ==
Professional record breakdown
3 matches	1 win	2 losses
By knockout	1	2

Res.	Record	Opponent	Method	Event	Date	Round	Time	Location	Notes
Loss	1–2	Marek Samociuk	TKO (punches)	KSW 70: Pudzianowski vs. Materla	May 28, 2022	1	3:38	Łódź, Poland	
Loss	1–1	Marek Samociuk	TKO (punches)	KSW 60: De Fries vs. Narkun 2	April 24, 2021	2	0:27	Łódź, Poland	
Win	1–0	Quentin Domingos	TKO (leg injury)	KSW 54: Gamrot vs. Ziółkowski	August 29, 2020	1	2:22	Warsaw, Poland	

== Titles in boxing ==
- World Boxing Association
  - interim Oceania heavyweight title
- World Boxing Organization
  - interim Africa heavyweight title
  - Africa heavyweight title
- International Boxing Federation
  - Mediterranean heavyweight title

== See also ==
- List of current KSW fighters
- List of male mixed martial artists

Sporting positions
Regional boxing titles
Vacant Title last held by Joseph Parker	WBA Oceania heavyweight champion interim title 15 October 2015 – April 2016; Vacated	Vacant Title next held by Junlong Zhang
Vacant Title last held by Joseph Parker	WBO Africa heavyweight champion 15 October 2015 – July 2016; Vacated	Vacant Title next held by Ebenezer Tetteh
Vacant Title last held by Cyril Leonet	IBF Mediterranean heavyweight champion 1 October 2016 – present	Incumbent
Awards
Previous: Skender Halili vs. Jason Thompson; Round 2	The Ring magazine Round of the Year vs. Dominic Breazeale; Round 3; 2017	Next: Deontay Wilder vs. Tyson Fury; Round 12
