= Amir Mansour =

American professional boxer (born 1972)

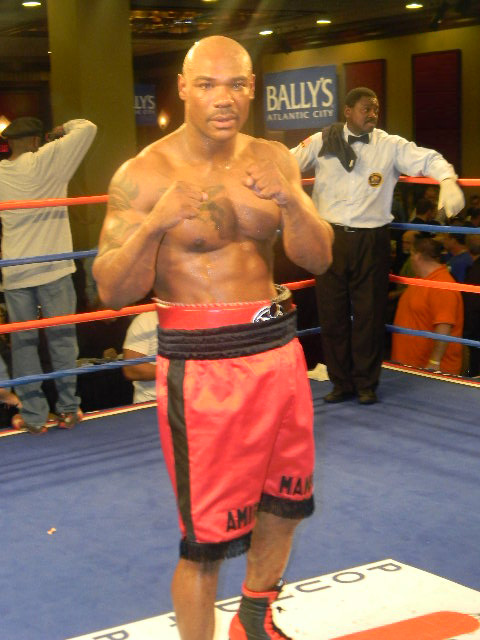
- Mansour in 2011

Personal information
- Nickname: Hardcore
- Born: Lavern Moorer; July 25, 1972 (age 54) Wilmington, Delaware, U.S.
- Height: 6 ft 1 in (185 cm)
- Weight: Heavyweight

Boxing career
- Reach: 74 in (188 cm)
- Stance: Southpaw

Boxing record
- Total fights: 29
- Wins: 23
- Win by KO: 16
- Losses: 4
- Draws: 1
- No contests: 1

Amir Mansour (born Lavern Moorer; July 25, 1972) is an American former professional boxer who competed between 1997 and 2019.

== Professional career ==
=== Early career ===
Mansour made his debut at the age of 24 against another debutant Clifton Graham at the Cedar Beach Park in Allentown, Pennsylvania, on July 12, 1997. Mansour knocked out Graham in round 1. Two months later, Mansour knocked out Malik Muhammad in two rounds. Mansour went undefeated in his next seven fights, with a record of 9 wins with 6 coming inside the distance. At that time, Mansour was 28 years old.

=== Comeback ===
==== Mansour vs. Ocgieng ====
At the age of 38, in his first fight since 2001, Mansour returned to the boxing ring to defeat 36-year-old Samuel Brown by knockout. Mansour stayed undefeated in his next four fights, winning them all by knockout. In May 2011, Mansour claimed the vacant World Boxing Foundation Intercontinental heavyweight title, knocking out Kenyan boxer Raymond Ochieng 1 minute and 45 seconds into the first round. This was his quickest victory recorded to date.

==== Mansour vs. Guinn and Mendoza ====
On August 19, 2011 he defeated former heavyweight contender Dominick Guinn by unanimous decision to win the NABO heavyweight title.

Mansour defended his title with a 6th-round TKO on December 2, 2011 against the Colombian boxer Epifanio Mendoza at Dover Downs Hotel & Casino, in Dover, DE.

On December 23, 2011, Mansour was sentenced to 14 months in prison for violating his probation.

=== Second comeback ===
Mansour came home from prison on July 12, 2012. Mansour started his road to redemption dedicating his life to family and helping children outside of the ring. While in the ring Mansour started his path to a becoming a world champion, resumed his boxing career on January 25, 2013, at the Dover Downs Hotel & Casino, where he faced Dominique Alexander. Mansour KO'd Alexander in only 24 seconds and improved his record to 17–0 (13). His last fight took place on April 12, 2013 in Dover, Delaware, USA. His opponent was Jason Gavern, a late replacement. Amir Mansour won by a first-round KO. Knocking down Jason Gavern four times.

==== Mansour vs. Harris ====
On August 23, 2013, Mansour fought for three minor heavyweight titles. He defended his WBF Intercontinental and also won the vacant USBA and interim NABA Heavyweight titles. His opponent was journeyman veteran Maurice Harris. Mansour weighed in at 226. The fight marked his first scheduled 12-round fight. In what was a tactical affair, Mansour won the fight by a 12-round unanimous decision. The scores were 120-108, 120-108 and 116-112, all for Mansour. The aggressor throughout the bout was Mansour who managed to mix up his head and body attack against his taller opponent. Harris managed to land some solid shots of his own, staying in the fight. Harris began to tire as the fight went on with Mansour continuing to apply pressure.

==== Mansour vs. Price ====
On October 30, 2013 Mansour signed a managerial contract with Joe Hand Promotions, Inc. On the new partnership, Mansour said, "I’m looking forward to working with Joe Hand. I’ve known Joe since 1997 when I turned pro and first trained at his gym. I would never train anywhere else. A lot of good fighters train there." The deal also included working with Russell Peltz, of Peltz Boxing Promotions, Inc. who would help promoting upcoming fights.

On December 14, Mansour recorded a TKO against Kelvin Price in New Jersey. Rather than scoring the early knockout, a feat that he had grown used to, Mansour treated Price like a stubborn stump that required several hundred whacks before eventually going down. After the fight, Mansour said, "He's so tall. I got so many different styles that I can make it rough and rugged. These guys aren't built like that anymore," Mansour also dropped Price once in round 5.

==== Mansour vs. Cunningham ====
Mansour's first fight of 2014 was a huge step-up in class, defending his USBA title against veteran Steve Cunningham (26-6-0, 12 KOs). The fight was announced in February, to take place on April 4 at the Liacouras Center on the campus of Temple University in Philadelphia. The fight was to main event NBCSN Fight Night. The fight was promoted by Main Events. Kathy Duva stated she was looking forward to the fight as it was a true evenly matched crossroads bout.

Mansour cut Cunningham above the left eye with a short right hook in the 2nd round. In the 5th round, Mansour knocked down Cunningham with a double right hook, then knocked him down a second time with a series of shots. Cunningham benefited from some very ponderous officiating by referee Smoger who counted very slowly then spent several seconds checking Cunningham after both counts, with the bell sounding to end the round after the second count. Mansour would swing wildly for the rest of the fight and Cunningham eventually made Mansour touch down with his gloves after a series of clean blows in the 10th and final round. The scores were 97-90 and 95-92 twice, all for Cunningham. The fight averaged 291,000 viewers on NBC Sports. Cunningham landed 117 of his 516 punches thrown (23%), with 91 power punches landed. Mansour landed 110 of 535 thrown (21%), which included 99 power punches landed.

After losing the fight, Mansour immediately spoke to the press and instead of complaining about the judgement, he talked about his opponent's (Cunningham) young daughter who needed a heart transplant. As a result of the publicity, more than $20,000 was donated to a special fund for Cunningham's daughter.

==== Mansour vs. Kassi ====
Following his first loss as a professional, Mansour made a comeback in November 2014. He fought 35-year-old Fred Kassi (18-2, 10 KOs) at the Sands Bethlehem Event Center in Bethlehem, Pennsylvania, and was shown live on NBCSN. In round 7, Mansour saw an opening and hit a counter right hook that put Kassi face first to the canvas, knocked out, ending the fight by knockout.

=== Career from 2015 to 2017 ===
Mansour took six months out after knocking out Kassi and next fought in May 2015 in the main event of an ESPN Friday Night Fights card at the 2300 Arena, which was a sell out. Mansour fought American Joey Dawejko. The fight went the full ten rounds in what was described as a 'tactical battle of punchers', as Mansour won after the three judges scored it (96-94, 98-92, 97-93).

==== Mansour vs. Washington ====
In September 2015, it was announced that Mansour would fight 33 year old unbeaten heavyweight contender Gerald Washington (16-0, 11 KOs) at the Little Creek Casino Resort in Shelton, Washington. Washington had his best win to date in March 2015 when he beat longtime veteran Jason Gavern in a 10-round decision victory. The fight took place on Tuesday 13 October 2015. The fight was scheduled to take place on Premier Boxing Champions on Fox Sports 1 from the Little Creek Casino Resort, in Shelton, Washington.

In a controversial decision, Mansour and Washington fought to a 10-round draw. The final judges’ scores were 97-93 for Washington, 96-94 for Mansour, and 95-95 draw. Washington landed 108 of 382 punches for a connect percentage of 26 while Mansour connected on 99 of 452 punches for a connect percentage of 22. Washington seemed to have gassed out after round 4. The crowd booed the results loudly, showing their displeasure with the decision. In the post fight interviews, Washington said he thought he did enough to win the fight.

==== Mansour vs. Breazeale ====
On December 29, 2015, Premier Boxing Champions announced that Mansour would Dominic Breazeale (16-0, 14 KOs) at the Staples Center in Los Angeles on January 23, 2016 on the undercard of Danny Garcia vs. Robert Guerrero, who would battle it out for the vacant WBC welterweight title. Mansour lost to Breazeale after he decided not to return from his stool after the 5th round. Breazeale had lost his mother Tina a few weeks before the fight on New Year's Eve due to a heart-attack. Although Mansour was ahead on all three judges scorecards (50-44, 50-44, 50-44), and also knocked down Breazeale in the third round for a 10-8 round, Breazeale however beat the count. Mansour had bit his tongue nearly in half in the second round and had trouble breathing through his nose and mouth as he entered the bout with a cold. He gave up on his stool. Breazeale earned $100,000 and Mansour had a $55,000 purse for the fight. Although Breazeale lost every round, he remained undefeated and went on fight for the IBF heavyweight title against titleholder Anthony Joshua, losing via a 7th round stoppage.

==== Mansour vs. Kauffman ====
In what started off as social media banter, a fight was confirmed between Mansour and 31-year-old American boxer Travis Kauffman (31–1, 23 KOs) to take place on February 25, 2017 on the undercard of WBC heavyweight champion Deontay Wilder's title defense against Gerald Washington at the Legacy Arena in Birmingham, Alabama. The fight was later rescheduled to take place on March 17 at the Santander Arena in Reading, Pennsylvania. Mansour won a majority decision when one judge scored it an even 114-114 and the other two scored it 117-111 and 115-113 in favor or Mansour. Mansour was rocked early in the fight, but managed to outwork Kauffman in a fight where many heavy shots were landed. In winning, Mansour ended Kaufman's 14-fight unbeaten streak. Kauffman felt as though he was robbed of the decision. Mansour called out WBC heavyweight king Deontay Wilder, "I want Wilder next. I am 44-years-old. I want my shot. They should give me my shot and try to get me out of the way, " also crediting the judges for being 'honorable'.

In July 2017, Mansour spoke out about not being able to get a good name opponent and a world title fight,

"You’d think I have the plague, the way the other so-called heavyweight contenders are avoiding me. These guys call themselves fighters but when my name comes up in conversation, they act like they have a hearing problem. Why would anyone be afraid of a 44-year-old man?"

After outpointing Kauffman, Mansour entered #15, but was dropped to #21, without having fought since. He mentioned about how Wilder was willing to fight Kauffman, had he defeated him,

"It’s a very frustrating and disappointing reality when a fight is made and the winner is said to fight the world (WBC) champion. When I fought Kauffman, Wilder was willing to fight Kauffman. They were sure Kauffman would win but he didn’t. I won that fight but now Wilder doesn’t want to fight me. His last fight was against Gerald Washington, a fighter that 98 percent of the viewers thought I beat (in 2015). The fight was scored a draw. Washington went on to fight Deontay for the title."

He also spoke about Alexander Povetkin's team offering him a fight for July 1, 2017, but insisted he get a ranking. His manager received a phone call initially about a potential fight but when Mansour landed the #15 slot with the WBC and WBO, there was no further communication from Povetkin's team. Mansour tried to get fights with British contender Dillian Whyte and former world title challenger Fres Oquendo,

"We tried to get a match in August with Dillian Whyte on the Terence Crawford card in Omaha. That went nowhere. Top Rank told us that Whyte wanted to fight a tall, right-handed guy. What a joke! I also was willing to step in on one week’s notice to fight Fres Oquendo for the WBA title in June when Shannon Briggs failed his test. The promoters canceled the show instead.”

Mansour restated that he would fight any heavyweight in the top 10 and criticized them for fighting 'no-name fighters'.

==== Mansour vs. Kuzmin ====
On October 30, Mansour announced that he had hired Ivaylo Gotzev, a veteran boxing advisor and agent, who he'd hoped to help him land big fights.

On November 7, it was reported that Mansour would replace heavyweight contender Lucas Browne and fight unbeaten 30-year-old Sergei Kuzmin (11–0, 8 KOs) for the vacant WBC International title in Russia on November 27. Browne was originally scheduled to fight Kuzmin for the WBA Inter-Continental title. Kuzmin, known for his amateur background, having beat the likes of Joe Joyce, Roberto Cammarelle and Ivan Dychko. Kuzmin said, "Browne refused, I will [box] with Mansour." At the official weigh in, Kuzmin weighed 241.9 pounds and Mansour came in lower at 224.8 pounds. The fight ended prematurely after 2 minutes and 45 seconds into round three and declared a technical draw. Both boxers suffered bad cuts from a clash of heads. Mansour was cut above his right eye and Kuzmin suffered a cut to his forehead. Ringside physician Vladimir Kurdhev took a look at both men and immediately called the fight off. The opening two rounds saw Mansour land the cleaner shots as he began to work over Kuzmin.

=== Career from 2018 to 2019 ===
==== Mansour vs. Hrgović ====
In July 2018, it was announced that 2016 Olympian Filip Hrgović (5-0, 4 KOs) would fight British boxer Gary Cornish (25-2, 13 KOs) at the Arena Zagreb in Croatia on September 8 for the WBC International title. On August 21, for medical reasons, Cornish was ruled out of the fight. He was replaced by Mansour, who was regarded as Hrgović's toughest opponent to date. Hrgović delivered a performance to claim the WBC International title with a third-round knockout win over Mansour. Mansour was hurt with Hrgović's right hand in the opening two rounds. Mansour took a knee in round 3 following a straight right left hook combination. He then attempted to fight back but only took further punishment. Mansour was knocked down again by a flurry of punches from Hrgović and counted out by referee Daniel Van De Wiele with 51 seconds of the round remaining.

==== Mansour vs. Ajagba ====
On January 24, 2019 Premier Boxing Champions announced Shawn Porter would defend his WBC welterweight champion against mandatory challenger Yordenis Ugás at the Dignity Health Sports Park in Carson, California on March 9, 2019. The undercard was also announced, with Mansour returning to the ring to take on Nigerian rising prospect Efe Ajagba (8-0, 7 KOs) in an 8-round bout on FOX. Ajagba spoke of his confidence on taking on and defeating Mansour inside the distance and was looking to make a statement. Ajagba dominated Mansour over two rounds, forcing Mansour to retire on his stool, not coming out for round 3. Ajagba floored Mansour twice in round 1, who did well to survive the opening three minutes. In round 2, Mansour was wobbled and hurt again, taking punishment. After the fight, Ajagba said, “I want to be the best heavyweight in the world. That’s my dream. I’m going to go home and work hard and prepare for the next fight.” Mansour was paid $25,000 compared to Ajagba's $8,000 purse. The fight, which opened the telecast on FOX, averaged 1,282,000 viewers.

== Personal life ==
Mansour is a Muslim.

== Professional boxing record ==
28 fights	23 wins	4 losses
By knockout	16	3
By decision	7	1
Draws	1	

No.	Result	Record	Opponent	Type	Round, time	Date	Location	Notes
29	Loss	23–4–1 (1)	Efe Ajagba	RTD	2 (8), 3:00	Mar 9, 2019	Dignity Health Sports Park, Carson, California, U.S.	
28	Loss	23–3–1 (1)	Filip Hrgović	KO	3 (12), 2:09	Sep 8, 2018	Arena Zagreb, Zagreb, Croatia	For vacant WBC International heavyweight title
27	NC	23–2–1 (1)	Sergey Kuzmin	NC	3 (12), 2:45	Nov 27, 2017	Luzhniki Palace of Sports, Moscow, Russia	For vacant WBC International heavyweight title; Originally ruled a technical draw after both fighters cut from an accidental head clash, later ruled an NC after Mansour failed a drug test
26	Win	23–2–1	Travis Kauffman	MD	12	Mar 17, 2017	Santander Arena, Reading, Pennsylvania, U.S.	Won vacant WBC-USNBC and USA Pennsylvania State heavyweight titles
25	Loss	22–2–1	Dominic Breazeale	RTD	5 (10), 3:00	Jan 23, 2016	Staples Center, Los Angeles, California, U.S.	For vacant WBC Continental Americas heavyweight title
24	Draw	22–1–1	Gerald Washington	SD	10	Oct 13, 2015	Little Creek Casino Resort, Shelton, Washington, U.S.	
23	Win	22–1	Joey Dawejko	UD	10	May 8, 2015	2300 Arena, Philadelphia, Pennsylvania, U.S.	Won vacant USA Pennsylvania State heavyweight title
22	Win	21–1	Fred Kassi	KO	7 (10), 2:14	Nov 8, 2014	Sands Casino Resort, Bethlehem, Pennsylvania, U.S.	
21	Loss	20–1	Steve Cunningham	UD	10	Apr 4, 2014	Liacouras Center, Philadelphia, Pennsylvania, U.S.	Lost IBF-USBA heavyweight title
20	Win	20–0	Kelvin Price	RTD	7 (10), 3:00	Dec 14, 2013	Resorts Casino Hotel, Atlantic City, New Jersey, U.S.	
19	Win	19–0	Maurice Harris	UD	12	Aug 23, 2013	Dover Downs Hotel & Casino, Dover, Delaware, U.S.	Retained WBF Intercontinental heavyweight title; Won vacant IBF-USBA heavyweight title
18	Win	18–0	Jason Gavern	KO	1 (12), 2:43	Apr 12, 2013	Dover Downs Hotel & Casino, Dover, Delaware, U.S.	Retained WBF Intercontinental heavyweight title
17	Win	17–0	Dominique Alexander	KO	1 (10), 1:22	Jan 25, 2013	Dover Downs Hotel & Casino, Dover, Delaware, U.S.	
16	Win	16–0	Epifanio Mendoza	TKO	6 (10), 1:17	Dec 2, 2011	Dover Downs Hotel & Casino, Dover, Delaware, U.S.	Retained WBF Intercontinental heavyweight title
15	Win	15–0	Dominick Guinn	UD	10	Aug 19, 2011	Dover Downs Hotel & Casino, Dover, Delaware, U.S.	Won vacant IBF North American and WBO-NABO interim heavyweight titles
14	Win	14–0	Raymond Ochieng	TKO	1 (10), 1:45	May 27, 2011	Dover Downs Hotel & Casino, Dover, Delaware, U.S.	Won vacant WBF Intercontinental heavyweight title
13	Win	13–0	Hector Ferreyro	TKO	1 (8), 2:08	Apr 2, 2011	Bally's Atlantic City, Atlantic City, New Jersey, U.S.	
12	Win	12–0	Alexis Mejias	KO	2 (8), 0:35	Feb 25, 2011	Dover Downs Hotel & Casino, Dover, Delaware, U.S.	
11	Win	11–0	Joseph Rabotte	KO	3 (8), 1:04	Dec 3, 2010	Dover Downs Hotel & Casino, Dover, Delaware, U.S.	
10	Win	10–0	Samuel Brown	KO	2 (6), 1:31	Aug 27, 2010	Dover Downs Hotel & Casino, Dover, Delaware, U.S.	
9	Win	9–0	Fabian Garcia	TKO	1 (6)	Jun 1, 2001	Sands Casino Hotel, Atlantic City, New Jersey, U.S.	
8	Win	8–0	Jerry Arentzen	TKO	2	Nov 9, 2000	Days Inn, Allentown, Pennsylvania, U.S.	
7	Win	7–0	Byron Jones	TKO	2, 1:59	Jul 13, 1999	Wilmington, Delaware, U.S.	
6	Win	6–0	Ed Irving	UD	4	Sep 25, 1998	Shuler Gymnasium, Philadelphia, Pennsylvania, U.S.	
5	Win	5–0	Kevin Brister	KO	2	Jul 14, 1998	Big Kahuna, Wilmington, Delaware, U.S.	
4	Win	4–0	Sinclair Babb	PTS	4	Jun 12, 1998	Mohegan Sun Arena, Montville, Connecticut, U.S.	
3	Win	3–0	Kevin Lewis	UD	4	Nov 14, 1997	The Blue Horizon, Philadelphia, Pennsylvania, U.S.	
2	Win	2–0	Malik Muhammad	TKO	2 (4)	Sep 12, 1997	The Blue Horizon, Philadelphia, Pennsylvania, U.S.	
1	Win	1–0	Clifton Graham	KO	1 (4)	Jul 12, 1997	Cedar Beach Park, Allentown, Pennsylvania, U.S.	
