= Joseph Parker vs. Hughie Fury =

Boxing competition

- Date: 23 September 2017
- Venue: Manchester Arena, Manchester, UK
- Title on the line: WBO heavyweight title

Tale of the tape
Boxer	(New Zealand) Joseph Parker	(United Kingdom) Hughie Fury
Nickname		"The Fist of Fury"
Hometown	Auckland, New Zealand	Stockport, Greater Manchester, UK
Purse	£1,100,000	£750,000
Pre-fight record	23–0 (18 KOs)	20–0 (10 KOs)
Age	25 years, 8 months	23 years
Height	6 ft 4 in (193 cm)	6 ft 6 in (198 cm)
Weight	248 4/5 lb (113 kg)	231 1/2 lb (105 kg)
Style	Orthodox	Orthodox
Recognition	WBO; Heavyweight Champion; TBRB; No. 4 Ranked Heavyweight; The Ring; No. 5 Ranked Heavyweight	WBO; No. 1 Ranked Heavyweight

Result
- Parker wins via 12-round majority decision (118–110, 118–110, 114–114)

Joseph Parker vs. Hughie Fury was a professional boxing match contested between undefeated WBO heavyweight champion Joseph Parker, and the WBO mandatory challenger Hughie Fury. The bout took place on 23 September 2017, at the Manchester Arena in Manchester. Parker won the contest by a majority decision, with two judges scoring it 118–110 and the other 114–114. The fight was considered to build Parker's worldwide profile as well as earning him the most money he has received for a boxing fight to date.

== History ==
=== Background ===
In December 2016, David Haye was made mandatory challenger for Parker's world title. However, he chose to fight cruiserweight Tony Bellew in a heavyweight grudge match on pay-per-view. This pushed Hughie Fury to become next in line for a title shot. As speculation grew, confirmation of the Parker versus Fury fight became closer after promoter Frank Warren indicated he would be announcing details of a fight in the coming week. After a deal not taking place between both fighters promoters, the WBO ordered a purse bid to take place at their offices in Puerto Rico the following week, with the winning bidder winning rights to choose the venue and date. Parker's promoters at Duco Events won the purse bid with a winning bid of US$3,000,011, announcing the date settled for 1 April in Auckland, New Zealand.

Higgins, from Duco Events, confirmed the bout would take place at the Spark Arena in New Zealand on 6 May. The reason behind the location was due to Parker enjoying fighting in front of his Kiwi fans. Months prior to the fight, Fury's father and trainer, Peter Fury, was denied a visa entry into New Zealand. This was due to his criminal past, dating back to around 1990 when he was incarcerated for ten years for drug-related offenses. Two days later, Peter was granted a special visa from 28 March to 10 May. But after the disappointing pull-out from Fury, Parker fought replacement Răzvan Cojanu. A frustrating fight for Parker, he extended his undefeated professional record to 23–0 and retained his WBO world heavyweight title belt after a unanimous decision victory. The win stated Parker would now look to fight overseas, aiming the United Kingdom to fight Fury.

With Fury still being the mandatory challenger, a date was organized for the fight to be rescheduled for 23 September in Manchester. A contract was signed by both parties and would take place at Manchester Arena after both fighters were originally due to fight in Auckland in May but Fury pulled out two weeks before the bout citing a back injury as the reason.

=== Ticket information ===
Tickets for the fight went on sale on 12 August after Hennessy Sports and Duco Events announced along with the undercard, that general admission tickets would start at a price of £40. Approximately 15,000 tickets went on sale to the general public. They had elected to go with CTS Eventim for distribution of sales. Tickets made available priced from £40, £60, £100, £150, £200, £300 and VIP £600. Although the event was jointly promoted by Hennessy Sports and Duco Events, Hennessy Sports were the lead promoter of the fight.

=== Controversy ===
Several issues occurred prior to the fight being announced. The date of the then proposed fight between Parker and Fury came up for discussion and was pushed forward to 6 May after Fury and his team appeared reluctant to travel to New Zealand for the fight scheduled for April. It saw WBO President Francisco Varcarcel take to social media to give Fury until 25 February to finalize the bout, otherwise, he would lose his position to challenge Parker for the world championship.

In late April, the title fight was called off after Fury pulled out claiming an injury less than two weeks out from the event in Auckland. Varcarcel stated the fight was now off and the problem lay within the Fury camp. After announcing the claim it gave Parker the rights to fight whomever he wanted when he wanted as a voluntary defense out of the top 15. Răzvan Cojanu was released as Parker's replacement for the Hughie Fury bout. The result saw the venue downgraded with it shifting from Spark Arena to the Vodafone Events Centre in Manukau which holds around 3000. Cojanu was ranked fourteenth giving him a chance to challenge for the world championship.

Five days out from the fight, The British Boxing Board of Control appointed British referee Terry O'Connor, the same official in charge of Fury's last two bouts. Peter Fury had a foul-mouthed exchange with David Higgins at the final press conference in London. It started off with Higgins approaching Fury, who was unhappy with the appointment of British referee O'Connor for the fight. Higgins was then ejected from the press conference by security officials. Overall Higgins' outburst caused a referee change after it began to create noise and headlines.

== The fight ==
Fury failed to capture his first world title after he was outworked by Parker. The fight went the 12 round distance, with two judges scoring the fight 118–110 in favour of Parker and the third judge had it 114–114, giving Parker the win via majority decision. Parker showed Fury respect throughout the fight, having to get through Fury's jab in order to land anything. The opening six rounds saw Fury flicking his jab in to thin air, which caused Parker to think twice before going on the attack. Parker started finding his shots in the latter half. Parker finished strong in the last two rounds as Fury started showing signs of fatigue.

== Aftermath ==
In the post fight, Parker said, "I felt the aggression was good on my side. He was really awkward and his movement was good, but I caught him with the harder punches I felt." Fury was paid £750,000 while Parker took home £1.1 million.

Promoter Mick Hennessy, as with the rest of the Fury camp, was disgusted with the wide scorecards, "This is corruption at its highest level in boxing. I thought it was an absolute masterclass, shades of Ali. Parker wasn't even in the fight. One of the worst decisions I've ever seen." He said he would be appealing the decision. WBO vice-president John Duggan backed the decision to have Parker as the winner. He made it clear that the result would not be investigated or overturned.

== Fight card ==
Confirmed bouts:

Weight Class	Weight		vs.		Method	Round	Time	Notes
Heavyweight	200+ lbs.	(New Zealand) Joseph Parker	def.	(United Kingdom) Hughie Fury	MD	12/12	3:00	^{Note 1}
Lightweight	135 lbs.	(United Kingdom) Joe Murray	def.	(United Kingdom) Matty Fagan	PTS	10/10	3:00
Bantamweight	118 lbs.	(United Kingdom) Josh Wale	def.	(United Kingdom) Don Broadhurst	KO	11/12		^{Note 2}
Super welterweight	148 lbs.	(United Kingdom) Jimmy Kelly	def.	(Bulgaria) Stiliyan Kostov	TKO	4/12	2:59	^{Note 3}
Welterweight	147 lbs.	(Republic of Ireland) Peter McDonagh	def.	(United Kingdom) Shayne Singleton	PTS	10/10	3:00
Super featherweight	130 lbs.	(United Kingdom) Yusuf Safa	def.	(Lithuania) Simas Volosinas	PTS	6/6	3:00
Middleweight	160 lbs.	(United Kingdom) Jack Cullen	def.	(United Kingdom) Callum Ide	TKO	2/4	2:18

^Note 1 For WBO heavyweight title
^Note 2 For British bantamweight title
^Note 3 For WBO Inter-Continental junior middleweight title

== Broadcasting ==
With less than three weeks out from the bout, Hennessy Sports were yet to confirm a television deal. Duco promoter, David Higgins confirmed the fight would be broadcast in New Zealand on the Skys Arena channel at a cost of NZD$39.95 which represents a drop of up to NZD$20 cheaper than Parker's previous fights. Duco Events owned the television rights in Australia and Samoa with Hennessy Sports having the rest of the world to try to engage.

Early September, Hennessy Sports announced their new partnership with YouTube and announced that the title fight between Joseph Parker and Hughie Fury would be shown exclusively live in the United Kingdom and Ireland on a pay-per-view YouTube basis with further countries to be announced later on. A portion of the undercard would also be streamed for free before the main event with a special advance purchase offer price for UKP£9.99 in the United Kingdom and UKP€11.99 in the Republic of Ireland until 17 September.

Days out from the fight, Hennessy Sports announced a list of countries that could view the YouTube broadcast of the fight. It would be available in 23 countries. A number of key territories that could watch the showdown exclusively live were America, Canada and Mexico, plus Argentina, Hong Kong and Italy. Devices such as iPhone, iPad, Smart television, and games consoles could watch the event via their respective YouTube apps. Broadcasting from 6:00 pm United Kingdom time, would be the beginning time for the pre-fight build up. Beforehand, a portion of the undercard will be free-to-view.

International broadcasters
Country	Broadcaster
Argentina	YouTube
Australia	Main Event
Austria	YouTube
Bosnia	YouTube
Canada	YouTube
Costa Rica	YouTube
Ecuador	YouTube
Germany	YouTube
Greece	YouTube
Hong Kong	YouTube
Hungary	YouTube
Iceland	YouTube
Ireland	YouTube
Italy	YouTube
Mexico	YouTube
Netherlands	YouTube
New Zealand	Sky Arena
Portugal	YouTube
Romania	YouTube
Samoa	TV3
Slovakia	YouTube
South Korea	YouTube
Spain	YouTube
Taiwan	YouTube
United Kingdom	YouTube
United States	YouTube

== Recap ==
=== Scorecard ===
Rocky Young		John Madfis		Terry O'Connor	
Parker	Fury	Parker	Fury	Parker	Fury
114	114	118	110	118	110

Preceded by vs. Răzvan Cojanu	Joseph Parker's bouts 23 September 2017	Succeeded by vs. Anthony Joshua
Preceded by vs. Fred Kassi	Hughie Fury's bouts 23 September 2017	Succeeded by vs. Sam Sexton
