= Deontay Wilder vs. Dominic Breazeale =

Boxing competition

- Date: May 18, 2019
- Venue: Barclays Center, Brooklyn, New York
- Title(s) on the line: WBC Heavyweight Championship

Tale of the tape
Boxer	(United States) Deontay Wilder	(United States) Dominic Breazeale
Nickname	"The Bronze Bomber"	"Trouble"
Hometown	Tuscaloosa, Alabama	Glendale, California
Pre-fight record	40–0–1 (39 KO)	20–1 (18 KO)
Age	33 years, 6 months	33 years, 8 months
Height	6 ft 7 in (201 cm)	6 ft 7 in (201 cm)
Weight	223.25 lb (101 kg)	255 lb (116 kg)
Style	Orthodox	Orthodox
Recognition	WBC; Heavyweight Champion; The Ring/TBRB; No. 3 Ranked Heavyweight	WBC; No. 4 Ranked Heavyweight

Result
- Wilder wins via 1st-round KO

Deontay Wilder vs. Dominic Breazeale was a professional boxing match contested on May 18, 2019 for the WBC Heavyweight Championship. The fight aired live on Showtime.

== Background ==
On May 18, 2019, Wilder defended his WBC heavyweight title against mandatory challenger Dominic Breazeale, who was ranked #4 by the WBC.

Prior to the fight, Wilder had again made controversial comments about wanting to kill an opponent in the ring, saying he was "trying to get a body on my record", and that "[boxing] is the only sport where you can kill a man and get paid for it at the same time." This was not the first time Wilder had alluded to killing an opponent, having made similar remarks previously in 2017 about Bermane Stiverne. However, despite the pre-fight animosity, the two men reconciled after the fight's conclusion, with Wilder saying "I've told him [Breazeale] I love him and I want to see him go home to his family".

== The fight ==
Breazeale was knocked out in the first round with 43 seconds left in the first round. Wilder caught him with a powerful right which sent Breazeale flat on his back and unable to continue with the referee waving off the contest after reaching the ten count. This marked his second ever professional loss.

== Reception ==
It was the highest-viewed Showtime boxing event of the year. Live viewership was recorded at 886,000 viewers. When accounting for all viewing platforms, including live broadcasts, on-demand initial replays, and live streaming, the total viewership reached 1,100,000.

== Broadcasting ==
Country	Broadcaster
United Kingdom	Sky Sports
United States	Showtime

Preceded by vs. Tyson Fury	Deontay Wilder' bouts May 18, 2019	Succeeded by vs. Luis Ortiz II
Preceded by vs. Carlos Negrón	Dominic Breazeale's bouts May 18, 2019	Succeeded by vs. Otto Wallin
