= Travis Kauffman =

American boxer (born 1985)

Personal information
- Nickname: My Time
- Born: August 21, 1985 (age 40) Reading, Pennsylvania, U.S.
- Height: 6 ft 3 in (191 cm)

Boxing career
- Reach: 76 in (193 cm)
- Stance: Orthodox

Boxing record
- Total fights: 37
- Wins: 32
- Win by KO: 23
- Losses: 4
- No contests: 1

Travis Kauffman (born August 21, 1985) is an American former professional boxer.

== Background and amateur career ==
Kauffman was born and raised alongside his brother Jason, in Reading, Pennsylvania. Kauffman's father, Marshall, a former 7–1 amateur boxer who gave up a career to raise the boys, began training his sons from a young age. After taking some time off from the sport during his upbringing and being sent to local juvenile detention centers, Kauffman returned to an amateur career; at age 15 he won the Middle Atlantic tournament, then was selected for the 2001 junior Olympic team. Despite his mother passing away just a week before he was scheduled to compete, Kauffman finished third. Unfortunately, he had also neglected to inform his probation officer he was leaving the country and was disciplined for this on his return. At age 17, Kauffman made it to the semifinals of the 2003 National Golden Gloves Super Heavyweight tournament, where he was defeated by 23-year-old Travis Walker. Upon graduating high school, Kauffman attended Northern Michigan University on a full scholarship to box, but left the school after two months and won gold at the 2004 Police Athletic League national tournament. In 2005, Kauffman was undefeated in international tournaments, which include a finals win over 2000 Olympic bronze medalist Vugar Alakbarov, in a fight in which Kauffman fought southpaw due to an ailing right wrist. Kauffman also won a national silver medal in 2005.

== Professional career ==
After compiling a 52–12 amateur record over four years and achieving the number one ranking, Kauffman made his professional debut in 2006. He won via second-round KO.

On December 5, 2008, Kauffman made his national TV debut with a third-round knockout (KO) of once-beaten Malachy Farrell (who outweighed Kauffman by 60 lb) on ShoBox: The New Generation. Kauffman followed up with a pair of early knockouts against clubfighters Cliff Couser and southpaw Livin Castillo.

In 2009, he was knocked out by Tony Grano. Kauffman asked Grano for a rematch but was turned down several times. He then fought Mike Miller, winning a shut-out unanimous decision (UD). Kauffman followed this up with a two-round knockout of Chris Koval and picked up the WBF intertitle.

This led to a promotional agreement with Empire Sports and Entertainment. Kauffman was released by Empire and then re-signed in 2012 with the same promoter using the name Greg Cohen Promotions.

Kauffman was then 21–1 with 16 KOs. On December 17, 2010, he fought Ross Thompson and won by DQ. He then fought Sean Williams, whom he knocked out in one round. Kauffman fought Charles Davis, winning a seven-round UD, as the fight was stopped due to rain. In February 2013, Kauffman vs Willie Perryman ended in a second-round knockout win that put Kauffman to 24–1, with 18 KOs. At that time, he was ranked 14th by the WBA.

Kauffman won an eight-round unanimous decision over Arron Lyons in August 2013. Then in September 2013 Kauffman beat Stacy Frazier in two short rounds, breaking Frazier's ribs, to move to 26–1, 19 KOs, and was ranked 10th by the WBA.

Kauffman fought Jason Barnett on November 30, 2013, breaking his ribs in the fight but earning a first-round knockout win and the WBU interim heavyweight title.

Kauffman took on Vincent Thompson on January 25, 2014, out-working him over ten rounds and winning the WBA federation title that became Kauffman's third minor belt. Kauffman is currently on a 10-fight win streak. Kauffman has started to work with trainer Nassim Richardson and has help from Al Cole, a former cruiserweight title holder.

A December 15, 2015 fight against world title challenger Chris Arreola was ruled a majority decision for Arreola but was later changed to no contest. Kauffman and a significant number of media outlets felt he had won the fight.

At Santander Arena, in his hometown of Reading, Pennsylvania on September 9, 2016, Kauffman scored a second-round TKO over Josh Gormley.

On March 17, 2017, Kauffman fought Amir Mansour in a Fight of the Year candidate, losing via split decision.

Kauffman then faced former interim WBA Heavyweight Champion Luis Ortiz, in his second fight since being handed his first professional defeat at the hands of Deontay Wilder. Kauffman was defeated via tenth-round TKO.

== Personal life ==
Kauffman is a single father of three boys; Travis Jr., Christopher, and Jeremiah. Kauffman also adopted and raised two children who are now older, Julius and Neveah.

Kauffman's father Marshall, who is also his trainer, also trained former world champion Kermit Cintron.

In 2004, Kauffman was arrested after selling marijuana to an undercover police officer.

In 2008, Kauffman was charged with rape but was later acquitted, and in 2015, he received two years' probation after pleading guilty to charges of resisting arrest.

== Professional boxing record ==
37 fights	32 wins	4 losses
By knockout	23	3
By decision	8	1
By disqualification	1	0
No contests	1	

No.	Result	Record	Opponent	Type	Round, time	Date	Location	Notes
37	Loss	32–4 (1)	Otto Wallin	TKO	5 (10) 1:23	Aug 15, 2020	Mohegan Sun Arena, Uncasville, Connecticut, U.S.	
36	Loss	32–3 (1)	Luis Ortiz	TKO	10 (10), 1:55	Dec 1, 2018	Staples Center, Los Angeles, California, U.S.	
35	Win	32–2 (1)	Scott Alexander	MD	10	Jun 10, 2018	Pioneer Event Center, Lancaster, California, U.S.	
34	Loss	31–2 (1)	Amir Mansour	MD	12	Mar 17, 2017	Santander Arena, Reading, Pennsylvania, U.S.	
33	Win	31–1 (1)	Josh Gormley	TKO	2 (10)	Sep 9, 2016	Santander Arena, Reading, Pennsylvania, U.S.	
32	ND	30–1 (1)	Chris Arreola	NC	12	Dec 12, 2015	AT&T Center, San Antonio, Texas, U.S.	Originally a SD win for Arreola, later ruled an NC after he failed a drug test
31	Win	30–1	Epifanio Mendoza	KO	2 (8), 0:30	Sep 18, 2015	The Claridge Hotel, Atlantic City, New Jersey, U.S.	
30	Win	29–1	Richard Carmack	TKO	1 (6), 2:47	Aug 14, 2015	Prudential Center, Newark, New Jersey, U.S.	
29	Win	28–1	Vincent Thompson	UD	10	Jan 25, 2014	Sands Bethlehem, Bethlehem, Pennsylvania, U.S.	Won WBA interim Fedelatin heavyweight title
28	Win	27–1	Jason Barnett	KO	1 (8), 2:59	Nov 30, 2013	Santander Arena, Reading, Pennsylvania, U.S.	
27	Win	26–1	Stacy Frazier	RTD	2 (8)	Sep 21, 2013	Benton Convention Center, Winston-Salem, North Carolina, U.S.	
26	Win	25–1	Arron Lyons	UD	8	Aug 23, 2013	Valley Forge Casino and Resort, Valley Forge, Pennsylvania, U.S.	
25	Win	24–1	Willie Perryman	TKO	2 (6)	Feb 15, 2013	Omni New Daisy Theater, Memphis, Tennessee, U.S.	
24	Win	23–1	Charles Davis	TD	7 (8)	Aug 11, 2012	Gameface Sports Complex, Temple, Pennsylvania, U.S.	Fight stopped due to rainfall
23	Win	22–1	Sean Williams	TKO	1 (6)	Aug 20, 2011	Field House, Virginia Beach, Virginia, U.S.	
22	Win	21–1	Ross Thompson	DQ	4 (6)	Dec 17, 2010	Monroeville Convention Center, Monroeville, Pennsylvania, U.S.	Thompson disqualified for excessive holding
21	Win	20–1	Chris Koval	TKO	2 (10)	May 22, 2010	Sovereign Center, Reading, Pennsylvania, U.S.	Won vacant WBF Inter-Continental heavyweight title
20	Win	19–1	Mike Miller	UD	6	Feb 27, 2010	Rodeway Inn, Allentown, Pennsylvania, U.S.	
19	Loss	18–1	Tony Grano	KO	4 (10)	Sep 18, 2009	Chumash Casino, Santa Ynez, California, U.S.	
18	Win	18–0	William Shahan	TKO	1 (8)	Aug 7, 2009	Buffalo Bill's Star Arena, Primm, Nevada, U.S.	
17	Win	17–0	Livin Castillo	TKO	3 (8)	May 30, 2009	Sovereign Center, Reading, Pennsylvania, U.S.	
16	Win	16–0	Cliff Couser	KO	1 (6)	Feb 7, 2009	Honda Center, Anaheim, California, U.S.	
15	Win	15–0	Ken Murphy	KO	2 (6)	Jan 16, 2009	Osage Million Dollar Elm. Tulsa, Oklahoma, U.S.	
14	Win	14–0	Malachy Farrell	TKO	3 (8)	Dec 5, 2008	Chumash Casino Resort, Santa Ynez, California, U.S.	
13	Win	13–0	Josh Gutcher	TKO	1 (8)	Sep 13, 2008	Riveredge Hotel, Reading, Pennsylvania, U.S.	
12	Win	12–0	Travis Fulton	TKO	2 (6)	Jul 19, 2008	Civic Arena, Saint Joseph, Missouri, U.S.	
11	Win	11–0	Octavius Smith	TKO	1 (4)	Jun 26, 2008	Main Street Armory, Rochester, New York, U.S.	
10	Win	10–0	Dan Whetzel	UD	8	Apr 19, 2007	Michael's Eighth Avenue, Glen Burnie, Maryland, U.S.	
9	Win	9–0	Kevin Hood	KO	2 (4)	Mar 30, 2007	Phoenixville Area High School, Phoenixville, Pennsylvania, U.S.	
8	Win	8–0	Joe Stofle	TKO	3 (6)	Mar 10, 2007	The Riveredge Hotel, Reading, Pennsylvania, U.S.	
7	Win	7–0	Allen Prescott	KO	2 (6)	Sep 9, 2006	Sovereign Center, Reading, Pennsylvania, U.S.	
6	Win	6–0	James McCloskey	TKO	1 (4)	Aug 12, 2006	Thomas & Mack Center, Paradise, Nevada, U.S.	
5	Win	5–0	David Cleage	UD	6	May 12, 2006	Sovereign Center, Reading, Pennsylvania, U.S.	
4	Win	4–0	Mike Miller	UD	4	Mar 31, 2006	Lancaster Host Resort, Lancaster, Pennsylvania, U.S.	
3	Win	3–0	Robert Bell	TKO	1 (4)	Mar 18, 2006	Boardwalk Hall Atlantic City, New Jersey, U.S.	
2	Win	2–0	Benny Bland	KO	1 (4)	Feb 17, 2006	Riveredge Restaurant, Reading, Pennsylvania, U.S.	
1	Win	1–0	Jerome Boyer	TKO	2 (4)	Jan 26, 2006	Michael's Eighth Avenue, Glen Burnie, Maryland, U.S.	
