= Tony Grano =

American boxer (born 1980)

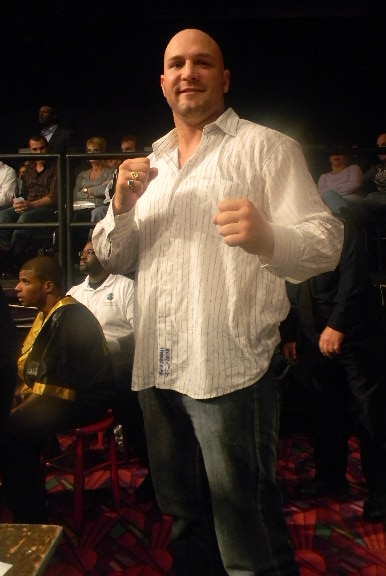
- Tony Grano ringside at a boxing card at Foxwoods, 2010

Personal information
- Nationality: American
- Born: Anthony Grano; November 11, 1980 (age 45) Hartford, Connecticut
- Height: 6 ft 2 in (1.88 m)
- Weight: Heavyweight

Boxing career
- Stance: Orthodox

Boxing record
- Total fights: 24
- Wins: 20
- Win by KO: 16
- Losses: 3
- Draws: 1

Anthony Grano (born November 11, 1980) is a former American professional boxer. As an amateur, Tony finished as a runner-up the 2005 USA National Golden Glove Championship and won the 2005 United States Amateur Heavyweight National Championship.

== Personal life ==
Tony Grano was born November 11, 1980, in Hartford, Connecticut. Grano is of Italian descent. He graduated from RHAM High School. in Hebron, Connecticut.

== Amateur career ==
Tony Grano debuted in boxing in January 2004. He competed in the 2004 USA Eastern Trials where he lost to Arturo Reyes by points. He also competed in the 2004 and 2005 USA National Golden Gloves Championships. In 2004, Grano defeated Paul Vasquez in the preliminary round, before losing to Austin Ejoifor in the Quarterfinals. In 2005, he cruised his way through the U.S. National Championships, and defeated Homero Fonseca via corner retirement, and was crowned as the 2005 United States Amateur Heavyweight Championship. He later competed for the 2005 USA National Golden Gloves Championships. He made it all the way to the final round before losing to Eric Fields via majority decision.

== Professional career ==
Grano debuted in professional boxing in November 2005. In 2009, Grano scored a knockout over Travis Kauffman. It was Ring Magazine 2009 heavyweight fight of the year. After stopping veteran Brian Minto in a NABF heavyweight title eliminator in the third round. Grano challenged Nicolai Firtha in 2010 for the vacant NABF USA heavyweight title. Grano was knocked out in the 2nd round of the fight. Grano knocked out shopworn 43-year-old former contender DaVarryl Williamson for the vacant NABF heavyweight title. He lost his momentum after a unanimous decision loss to Eric Molina in 2013. Grano retired following the loss, finishing his career 20-3-1.

== Professional boxing record ==
24 fights	20 wins	3 losses
By knockout	16	2
By decision	4	1
Draws	1	

No.	Result	Record	Opponent	Type	Round, time	Date	Location	Notes
24	Loss	20–3–1	(Mexico) Éric Molina	UD	12	Apr 27, 2013	(United States) Citizens Business Bank Arena, Ontario, California, U.S.	Lost NABF heavyweight title.
23	Win	20–2–1	(United States) DaVarryl Williamson	KO	4 (12), 2:27	Jun 23, 2012	(United States) Seminole Hard Rock Hotel & Casino, Hollywood, Florida, U.S.	Won vacant NABF heavyweight title.
22	Win	19–2–1	(United States) Brian Minto	TKO	3 (10), 1:04	Jan 28, 2012	(United States) Turning Stone Resort & Casino, Verona, New York, U.S.	
21	Win	18–2–1	(United States) Dominique Alexander	TKO	6 (6), 2:09	Apr 9, 2011	(United States) Connecticut Convention Center, Hartford, Connecticut, U.S.	
20	Loss	17–2–1	(United States) Nicolai Firtha	TKO	2 (10), 2:15	Jun 26, 2010	(United States) Mohegan Sun Casino, Uncasville, Connecticut, U.S.	For vacant NABF USA heavyweight title.
19	Win	17–1–1	(United States) Mark Brown	UD	10	Mar 12, 2010	(United States) Foxwoods Resort Casino, Mashantucket, Connecticut, U.S.	
18	Win	16–1–1	(United States) Travis Kauffman	KO	4 (10), 2:56	Sep 18, 2009	(United States) Chumash Casino Resort, Santa Ynez, California, U.S.	
17	Win	15–1–1	(United States) Jermell Barnes	UD	6	Feb 27, 2009	(United States) Lion's Den Fitness Center, Middletown, Connecticut, U.S.	
16	Loss	14–1–1	(United States) Mark Brown	TKO	8 (8), 1:10	Sep 27, 2008	(United States) Arena at Harbor Yard, Bridgeport, Connecticut, U.S.	For vacant WBF All-Americas heavyweight title.
15	Win	14–0–1	(United States) Leroy Childs	TKO	1 (8), 2:43	Jun 13, 2008	(United States) Connecticut Convention Center, Hartford, Connecticut, U.S.	
14	Win	13–0–1	(United States) John Battle	TKO	2 (8), 0:34	Dec 1, 2007	(United States) Foxwoods Resort Casino, Mashantucket, Connecticut, U.S.	
13	Win	12–0–1	(United States) David Polk	SD	8	Nov 8, 2007	(United States) Mohegan Sun Casino, Uncasville, Connecticut, U.S.	
12	Win	11–0–1	(United States) Kevin Tallon	KO	1 (4), 0:30	Oct 6, 2007	(United States) Louisville Gardens, Louisville, Kentucky, U.S.	
11	Win	10–0–1	(United States) James Phipps	TKO	1 (8), 1:25	Jun 29, 2007	(United States) Connecticut Convention Center, Hartford, Connecticut, U.S.	
10	Win	9–0–1	(United States) Jay Sweetman	TKO	1 (6)	May 4, 2007	(United States) Mohegan Sun Casino, Uncasville, Connecticut, U.S.	
9	Win	8–0–1	(United States) John Turlington	TKO	1 (6), 2:25	Mar 23, 2007	(United States) Foxwoods Resort Casino, Mashantucket, Connecticut, U.S.	
8	Win	7–0–1	(United States) Tyrone Smith	UD	6	Feb 23, 2007	(United States) Mohegan Sun Casino, Uncasville, Connecticut, U.S.	
7	Win	6–0–1	(United States) Larry White	TKO	3 (4), 2:46	Oct 28, 2006	(United States) Mohegan Sun Casino, Uncasville, Connecticut, U.S.	
6	Win	5–0–1	(United States) Mike Miller	TKO	2 (4), 2:54	Sep 23, 2006	(United States) Connecticut Convention Center, Hartford, Connecticut, U.S.	
5	Draw	4–0–1	(United States) Rodney Ray	UD	6	May 24, 2006	(United States) Hammerstein Ballroom, New York City, New York, U.S.	
4	Win	4–0	(United States) Mike Jones	KO	2 (4), 1:08	May 10, 2006	(United States) Foxwoods Resort Casino, Mashantucket, Connecticut, U.S.	
3	Win	3–0	(United States) Robert Irizarry	TKO	1 (4), 1:02	Feb 18, 2006	(United States) Mohegan Sun Casino, Uncasville, Connecticut, U.S.	
2	Win	2–0	(United States) Tim Gulley	KO	1 (4)	Dec 10, 2005	(United States) Mohegan Sun Casino, Uncasville, Connecticut, U.S.	
1	Win	1–0	(United States) Rubin Bracero	KO	2 (4)	Nov 23, 2005	(United States) Westchester County Center, White Plains, New York, U.S.	

Sporting positions
Preceded by Matt Godfrey	United States Amateur Heavyweight Champion; 2005	Succeeded by Adam Willett
