= Nicolai Firtha =

American former professional boxer

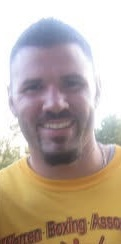
- Nicolai Firtha in 2010

Personal information
- Nickname: Stone Man
- Born: Nicolai Firtha; February 8, 1979 (age 47) Randolph Township, Ohio, USA
- Height: 6 ft 6 in (198 cm)

Boxing career
- Weight class: Heavyweight
- Stance: Orthodox

Boxing record
- Wins: 21
- Win by KO: 8
- Losses: 11
- Draws: 1

Nicolai Firtha (born February 8, 1979) is an American former professional boxer. As an amateur, Firtha competed in the 2004 United States Olympic Trials and National Championships.

== Personal life ==
Nicoali Firtha was born February 8, 1979, in Randolph, Ohio. Firtha graduated from Waterloo High School in Atwater, Ohio.

Following his boxing retirement, Firtha became a Talent Specialist with CBS, as a course player scout for Bridgestone Invitational, as well as Marketing.

== Amateur career ==
Nicolai Firtha competed in several amateur events from 2002 to 2004, including the National Golden Gloves Championships, the 2004 Olympic Trials and 2004 United States National Championships.

Nicolai Firtha competed in the 2004 Olympic Trials, losing to Mike Wilson by points on the first day. Firtha Beat Saul Ayon by points on day 2, and losing to Travis Walker on the final day of the Olympic Trials. Nicolai also competed in the 2004 United States National Championships, making his way to the Finals before losing to Mike Wilson due to injury.

== Professional career ==
Nicolai Firtha debuted in professional boxing in 2004, fighting 5 times within his first year as a professional, beating four of those opponents, and drawing against one. Firtha challenged James Northey for the vacant NABC Americas Heavyweight title in April 2004, losing to him in round 2 via TKO. He later fought against Tony Grano, for the vacant North American Boxing Association USA Heavyweight title. Firtha won via TKO in round 2. He retained it again in 2010 vs Mike Sheppard before vacating it after that fight. Firtha later went to fight future contenders such as Tyson Fury and Johnathan Banks. Firtha's final professional fight came against Deontay Wilder in October 2013, Firtha challenged Wilders WBC Continental Americas Heavyweight title. Firtha was downed twice in round one, before being knocked out by Wilders left hook in round 4. Firtha retired following this fight, finishing his career record 21–11–1.

== Professional boxing record ==
33 fights	21 wins	11 losses
By knockout	8	5
By decision	13	6
Draws	1	

Fight No.	Result	Opponent	Type	Round/Time	Location	Notes
33	Loss	Deontay Wilder	KO	4 (10) 1:26	Boardwalk Hall, Atlantic City	for WBC Continental Americas heavyweight title
32	Win	Robert Hawkins	MD	6	Mountaineer Casino Racetrack and Resort, Chester	
31	Loss	Johnathon Banks	UD	12	Olympiahalle, Munich	for NABF heavyweight title
30	Loss	Tyson Fury	TKO	5 (12) 2:19	Kings Hall, Belfast	
29	Win	Ross Thompson	UD	5	Bob Cene Park, Struthers, Youngstown	
28	Loss	Alexander Povetkin	UD	10	Max Schmeling Halle, Prenzlauer Berg	
27	Win	Mike Sheppard	MD	10	Nautica In The Flats, Cleveland	
26	Win	Tony Grano	TKO	2 (10) 2:15	Mohegan Sun Casino, Uncasville	for vacant Ohio Athletic Commission heavyweight title; retained NABA heavyweight title
25	Win	Joseph Rabotte	UD	6	Lutheran High School East, Cleveland	for NABA heavyweight title
24	Loss	Manuel Quezada	UD	10	Tachi Palace Hotel & Casino, Lemoore	
23	Loss	Tye Fields	KO	6 (12) 0:43	The Venue at River Cree, Enoch	
22	Loss	Neven Pajkic	UD	8	Royal York Hotel, Toronto	
21	Win	Villi Bloomfield	UD	6	Orleans Hotel & Casino, Las Vegas	
20	Win	Jason Bergman	UD	6	Mountaineer Casino Racetrack and Resort, Chester	
19	Win	Carlton Johnson	TKO	3 (8) 2:37	Mountaineer Casino Racetrack and Resort, Chester	
18	Win	Mike Jones	UD	4	Avalon Hotel, Erie	
17	Win	Mike Miller	UD	6	Heinz Field, Pittsburgh	
16	Win	Carlton Johnson	TKO	4 (4) 2:49	Jerry Uht Park, Erie	
15	Loss	Franklin Lawrence	UD	6	The Tangier, Akron	
14	Win	Ed Perry	SD	6	Wolstein Center, Cleveland	
13	Loss	Josue Blocus	TKO	7 (8) 2:28	Wild Bills, Duluth	
12	Loss	James Northey	TKO	2 (8) 2:47	Mountaineer Casino Racetrack and Resort, Chester	for vacant NABC Americas heavyweight title
11	Win	Jeff Yeoman	TKO	4 (6)	Mountaineer Casino Racetrack and Resort, Chester	
10	Win	Mike Miller	UD	6	Mountaineer Casino Racetrack and Resort, Chester	
9	Win	Otis Mills	SD	6	Gray's Armory, Cleveland	
8	Win	Julius Joiner	UD	4	DeCarlo's Convention Center, Warren	
7	Loss	Lamar Stephens	UD	6	Andiamo Italian, Warren	
6	Win	David Chappell	TKO	3 (6) 1:49	Fort Lee MacLaughlin Gym, Richmond	
5	Win	Mark Johnson	TKO	3 (4) 3:00	Mountaineer Casino Racetrack and Resort, Chester	
4	Draw	Lamar Stephens	MD	6	Ramada Inn, Rosemont	
3	Win	Keith Steffan	TKO	1 (4)	Andiamo's Banquet Center, Warren	
2	Win	Cornell Bradbury	UD	4	Chapparells, Akron	
1	Win	Toby Vaughn	TKO	3 (4) 0:19	Chapparells, Akron	
