= Christian Thun =

German boxer (born 1992)

Personal information
- Nickname: Hurricane
- Born: 24 February 1992 (age 34) Ennepetal, Germany
- Height: 2.04 m (6 ft 8 1/2 in)
- Weight: Heavyweight

Boxing career
- Stance: Orthodox

Boxing record
- Total fights: 11
- Wins: 9
- Win by KO: 7
- Losses: 2

Christian Alfred Thun (born 24 February 1992) is a German professional boxer who has held the IBO Continental heavyweight title since 2020.

== Personal life ==
Christian Alfred Thun was born on 24 February 1992 in Ennepetal, Germany, to a German father and Italian mother. He moved to Italy when he was 5 and then to England around 12 years old, where he began his amateur boxing career. He was introduced to boxing at the Peacock Gym in London and had his first fight at 15. After spending most of his career in England, Thun had the opportunity to box in Italy in 2013, where he secured a place on the Italian Olympic team.

Alongside boxing, in which he compiled an amateur record of 49–6, Thun also obtained a Bachelor's degree in International Business Management in London. He speaks five languages; English, Italian, German, Spanish, and Russian.

== Professional career ==
Thun made his professional debut on 2 March 2018, scoring a second-round technical knockout (TKO) victory against Georgi Urjumelashvili at the Espace Leó Ferré in Fontvieille, Monaco.

He scored two victories in 2018–a knockout (KO) against Davit Gogishvili in June and a points decision (PTS) against Euloge Bakanda Boule in September–before facing Viktar Chvarkou on 16 March 2019, at the Hotel W in Barcelona, Spain. Thun emerged victorious after Chvrakou was disqualified in the sixth round for two intentional headbutts.

After a stoppage victory against Jason Bergman in August 2020, Thun fought for his first regional championship against Mirko Tintor on 14 November at the Universum Gym in Hamburg, Germany. In a fight which saw Thun knock his opponent down in the first and second rounds, he went on to capture the vacant IBO Continental heavyweight title via third-round corner retirement (RTD) after Tintor quit on his stool before the start of the fourth round.

The first defence of his IBO regional title is scheduled to take place on 13 August 2021, at Atlantis The Palm in Dubai, against former world champion Lucas Browne.

== Professional boxing record ==
9 fights	8 wins	1 loss
By knockout	6	0
By decision	1	1
By disqualification	1	0

No.	Result	Record	Opponent	Type	Round, time	Date	Location	Notes
9	Loss	8–1	Curtis Harper	MD	8	9 July 2022	Whitesands Events Center, Plant City, Florida, US	
8	Win	8–0	Amron Sands	TKO	1 (8), 2:22	25 March 2022	Whitesands Events Center, Plant City, Florida, US	
7	Win	7–0	Keenan Hickmon	TKO	1 (6), 1:47	19 Nov 2021	Buckhead Fight Club, Atlanta, Georgia, US	
6	Win	6–0	Mirko Tintor	RTD	3 (10), 3:00	14 Nov 2020	Universum Gym, Hamburg, Germany	Won vacant IBO Continental heavyweight title
5	Win	5–0	Jason Bergman	RTD	5 (8), 3:00	15 Aug 2020	Ocean Center, Daytona Beach, Florida, US	
4	Win	4–0	Viktar Chvarkou	DQ	6 (6)	16 Mar 2019	Hotel W, Barcelona, Spain	
3	Win	3–0	Euloge Bakanda Boule	PTS	8	14 Sep 2018	Recinto Ferial, Albacete, Spain	
2	Win	2–0	Davit Gogishvili	KO	1 (4)	23 Jun 2018	Hotel Novotel Madrid Center, Madrid, Spain	
1	Win	1–0	Georgi Urjumelashvili	TKO	2 (4)	2 Mar 2018	Espace Leó Ferré, Fontvieille, Monaco	

Sporting positions
Regional boxing titles
Vacant Title last held by Patrick Korte	IBO Continental heavyweight champion 14 November 2020 – present	Incumbent
