= Dominic Breazeale =

American boxer (born 1985)

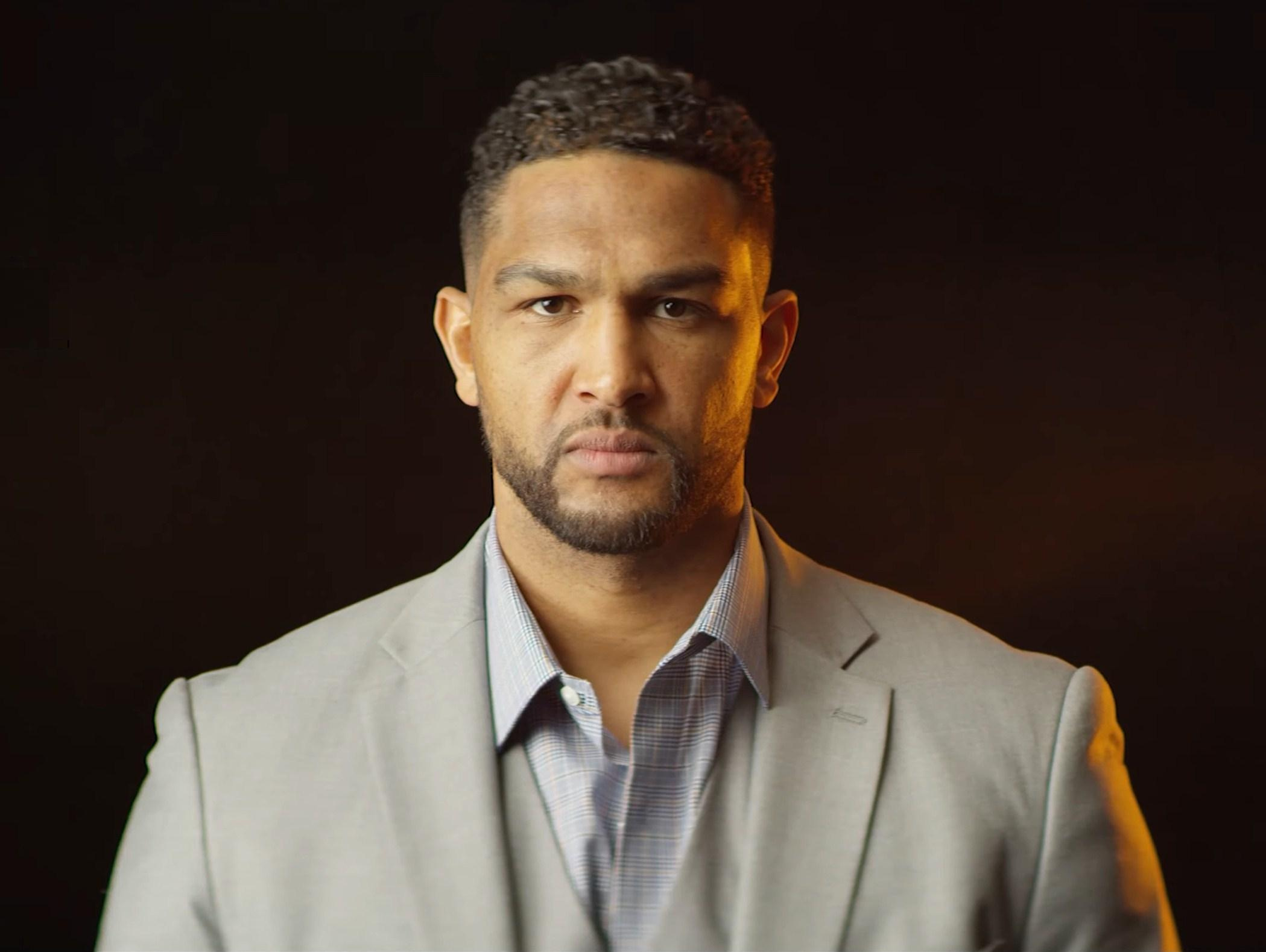

Personal information
- Nickname: Trouble
- Born: Dominic Angelo Breazeale; August 24, 1985 (age 41) Glendale, California, U.S.
- Height: 6 ft 7 in (201 cm)
- Weight: Heavyweight

Boxing career
- Reach: 81 1/2 in (207 cm)
- Stance: Orthodox

Boxing record
- Total fights: 23
- Wins: 20
- Win by KO: 18
- Losses: 3

Dominic Angelo Breazeale (born August 24, 1985) is an American former professional boxer who competed from 2012 to 2021. He challenged for the world heavyweight championship twice; for the IBF title in 2016 and WBC title in 2019. As an amateur, he represented United States at the 2012 Olympics.

== Early life ==
Breazeale was born in Glendale, California, United States. He started playing football and was quarterback on the football team at Mt. SAC and the University of Northern Colorado before starting boxing.

== Amateur career ==
Breazeale first started boxing at the age of 23. As an amateur, Breazeale won the 2012 U.S. National Super Heavyweight championship at the Fort Carson Special Events Center in Colorado Springs, Colorado. Breazeale later qualified for the 2012 Olympic Games in London after winning the Olympic trials and earning himself a place on the US Olympic team. He lost in the preliminary round to Russia's Magomed Omarov, with a score of 19–8.

== Professional career ==
=== Early career ===
Breazeale made his professional debut on November 9, 2012 against Curtis Lee Tate. Breazeale won the fight by 1st round knock out. He fought again later that month, knocking out Mike Bissett in the second round. He went on to have multiple knock out wins in 2013. On August 24, 2013, Breazeale fought Jamaican Lenroy Thomas. Breazeale knocked Thomas out in the 4th round. He went on to get two more knock out wins against Jon Hill and Keith Barr towards the end of 2013. Breazeale's first fight of 2014 was against Homero Fonseca, Breazeale won the fight after Homero was retired on his stool after the 3rd round. Breazeale's next fight was against Nagy Aguilera, he won the fight by unanimous decision. This was the first time Breazeale had gone the distance. He went on to have three more knock out wins towards the end of 2014.

His first fight of 2015 was against Victor Bisbal, which he won by knock out in the 4th round. Breazeale then went on to knock out Yasmany Consuegra in the third round. On September 26, 2015, Breazeale won a controversial and disputed points decision over Cameroonian fighter Fred Kassi.

==== Breazeale vs. Martin cancellation ====
Breazeale was originally scheduled to face fellow contender Charles Martin on a PBC card in San Antonio Texas but Martin withdrew in pursuit of an IBF title bout.

==== Breazeale vs. Mansour ====
On January 26, 2016, Breazeale was involved in a tough bout against fellow American Amir Mansour, during which Breazeale was floored in the third round before coming back to win after Mansour suffered a severe laceration in his mouth after biting through his tongue and was forced to quit on his stool at the end of the fifth round.

==== Breazeale vs. Joshua ====
In April 2016, Breazeale was selected as the opponent for Anthony Joshua's first defense of his IBF heavyweight title, with the fight taking place on June 25, 2016 at the O2 Arena in London. Breazeale had little success and the fight was eventually stopped in the seventh round after Breazeale was knocked down for the second time.

==== Breazeale vs. Ugonoh ====
On February 25, 2017, Breazeale fought undefeated heavyweight prospect Izu Ugonoh as a replacement over Artur Szpilka. According to Breazeale, Szpilka wanted to push the fight to a later date because he wanted more time to train and Breazeale didn't want that, he wanted to get back to the ring as soon as possible. This was his first fight back since his loss to Anthony Joshua. The fight saw explosive action with Ugonoh being dropped to the canvas in the third round. Ugonoh came back to hurt Breazeale and drop him in the 4th round. Breazeale eventually came out on top after he knocked Ugonoh through the ropes in the 5th round. The fight won round of the year from the Ring Magazine for the third round.

==== Breazeale vs. Molina ====
On November 4, 2017, Breazeale fought former world title challenger Eric Molina, on the undercard of the Deontay Wilder vs Bermane Stiverne rematch. Molina was ranked #12 by the WBC at the time. Breazeale won the fight after Molina did not come out from his corner after the 8th round. Breazeale had dropped Molina in the 8th round.

==== Breazeale vs. Negron ====
In his next fight, Breazeale fought Carlos Negrón. Breazeale won the fight in the ninth round via KO.

==== Breazeale vs. Wilder ====
On May 18, 2019, Breazeale faced WBC Heavyweight Champion Deontay Wilder and was knocked out in the first round. Wilder caught him with a powerful right which sent Breazeale's head onto the canvas and his body flat on his back and unable to continue with the referee waving off the contest after reaching the ten count. This marked his second ever professional loss.

==== Breazeale vs. Wallin ====
In his next fight, Dominic Breazeale faced Otto Wallin who was ranked #14 by the IBF and #15 by the WBA at heavyweight. Wallin dominated Breazeale throughout most of the fight, and won the fight convincingly on all three scorecards, 118–110, 117–111 and 116–112.

== Professional boxing record ==
23 fights	20 wins	3 losses
By knockout	18	2
By decision	2	1

No.	Result	Record	Opponent	Type	Round, time	Date	Location	Notes
23	Loss	20–3	Otto Wallin	UD	12	Feb 20, 2021	Mohegan Sun Arena, Montville, Connecticut, U.S.	
22	Loss	20–2	Deontay Wilder	KO	1 (12), 2:17	May 18, 2019	Barclays Center, New York City, New York, U.S.	For WBC heavyweight title
21	Win	20–1	Carlos Negrón	KO	9 (10), 1:37	Dec 22, 2018	Barclays Center, New York City, New York, U.S.	
20	Win	19–1	Éric Molina	RTD	8 (12), 3:00	Nov 4, 2017	Barclays Center, New York City, New York, U.S.	
19	Win	18–1	Izu Ugonoh	KO	5 (10), 0:50	Feb 25, 2017	Legacy Arena, Birmingham, Alabama, U.S.	
18	Loss	17–1	Anthony Joshua	TKO	7 (12), 1:01	Jun 25, 2016	The O2 Arena, London, England	For IBF heavyweight title
17	Win	17–0	Amir Mansour	RTD	5 (10), 3:00	Jan 23, 2016	Staples Center, Los Angeles, California, U.S.	
16	Win	16–0	Fred Kassi	UD	10	Sep 26, 2015	Legacy Arena, Birmingham, Alabama, U.S.	
15	Win	15–0	Yasmany Consuegra	TKO	3 (8), 1:49	Jun 6, 2015	StubHub Center, Carson, California, U.S.	
14	Win	14–0	Victor Bisbal	TKO	4 (8), 1:28	Mar 7, 2015	MGM Grand Garden Arena, Paradise, Nevada, U.S.	
13	Win	13–0	Epifanio Mendoza	KO	1 (8), 2:35	Dec 11, 2014	Pechanga Resort & Casino, Temecula, California, U.S.	
12	Win	12–0	Billy Zumbrun	KO	2 (8), 2:05	Aug 16, 2014	StubHub Center, Carson, California, U.S.	
11	Win	11–0	Devin Vargas	TKO	3 (10), 2:26	Jun 21, 2014	StubHub Center, Carson, California, U.S.	
10	Win	10–0	Nagy Aguilera	UD	8	Apr 3, 2014	Fantasy Springs Resort Casino, Indio, California, U.S.	
9	Win	9–0	Homero Fonseca	RTD	3 (8), 3:00	Jan 24, 2014	Fantasy Springs Resort Casino, Indio, California, U.S.	
8	Win	8–0	Keith Barr	TKO	2 (6), 2:29	Nov 26, 2013	BB&T Center, Sunrise, Florida, U.S.	
7	Win	7–0	Jon Hill	TKO	3 (8), 1:08	Sep 12, 2013	MGM Grand Marquee Ballroom, Paradise, Nevada, U.S.	
6	Win	6–0	Lenroy Thomas	KO	4 (8), 2:29	Aug 24, 2013	StubHub Center, Carson, California, U.S.	
5	Win	5–0	Lance Gauch	TKO	2 (6), 2:41	May 3, 2013	The Cosmopolitan of Las Vegas, Paradise, Nevada, U.S.	
4	Win	4–0	Ronny Hale	KO	2 (4), 1:16	Mar 8, 2013	Fantasy Springs Resort Casino, Indio, California, U.S.	
3	Win	3–0	Caleb Grummet	KO	2 (4), 0:45	Jan 11, 2013	Fantasy Springs Resort Casino, Indio, California, U.S.	
2	Win	2–0	Mike Bissett	TKO	2 (4), 1:17	Nov 24, 2012	Citizens Business Bank Arena, Ontario, California, U.S.	
1	Win	1–0	Curtis Lee Tate	TKO	1 (4), 1:06	Nov 9, 2012	Fantasy Springs Resort Casino, Indio, California, U.S.	

Sporting positions
Regional boxing titles
Vacant Title last held by Tony Thompson	WBC Continental Americas heavyweight champion 23 January 2016 – June 2017; Vacated	Vacant Title next held by Carlos Negron
Awards
Previous: Skender Halili vs. Jason Thompson; Round 2	The Ring Round of the Year vs. Izu Ugonoh; Round 3; 2017	Next: Deontay Wilder vs. Tyson Fury; Round 12
