= Fred Kassi =

American boxer

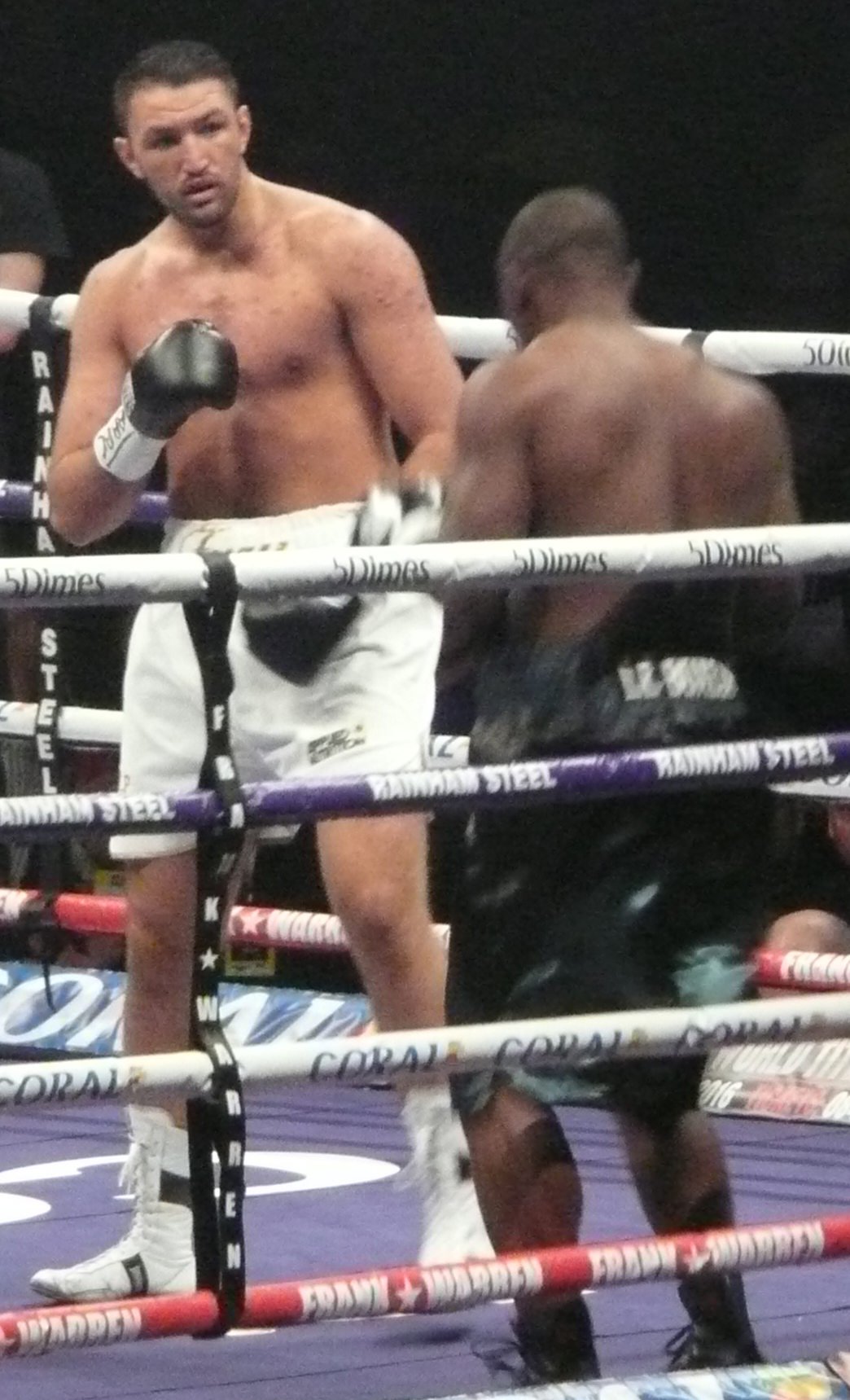
- Kassi (r.) fighting Hughie Fury at the Copper Box in London

Personal information
- Nickname: Action
- Nationality: American
- Born: September 4, 1979 (age 47) Douala, Cameroon
- Height: 183
- Weight: Heavyweight

Boxing career
- Reach: 189
- Stance: Orthodox

Boxing record
- Total fights: 27
- Wins: 18
- Win by KO: 10
- Losses: 8
- Draws: 1

Fred Kassi (born September 4, 1979) is a Cameroonian-born American professional boxer based in New Orleans, Louisiana.

== Professional career ==
After winning 15 of his first 16 professional fights, Kassi faced his first tough opponent. He was set to face Kendrick Releford in Hollywood Casino, Bay St. Louis, Mississippi, on April 24, 2010. He eventually lost the fight via unanimous points decision, after 10 rounds.

Three times, he fought American contender Chris Arreola, on July 18, 2015, at Don Haskins Center in El Paso, Texas. The fight aired on PBC and CBS. The fight resulted in a controversial draw; many, including ringside observers, such as analyst Steve Farhood, believed that Kassi won the fight.

After the controversy with Arreola, Kassi fought Dominic Breazeale at the Legacy Arena in Birmingham, Alabama. He lost via another controversial points decision. Breazeale was given a unanimous decision win by judges. Most observers regarded the fight as a draw or close-run win for Kassi.

Kassi was set to fight Hughie Fury for the vacant WBO Inter-Continental heavyweight title at the Copper Box Arena on April 30, 2016. Kassi lost the fight via technical decision. The bout went to the scorecards after seven rounds when Fury was left with a gash over his left eye because of an accidental clash of heads. Kassi pressured Fury throughout the fight, landing power shots on his head. Fury struggled to contain him until the fight was suspended.

Kassi was set to face Jarrell Miller on August 29, 2016, for the WBO-NABO heavyweight title. The fight took place in Rhinos Stadium, Rochester, and Kassi lost as he retired in the third round, citing hand injury.

== Professional boxing record ==
18 Wins (10 knockouts), 9 Losses (1 knockout), 1 Draw
Result	Record	Opponent	Type	Round	Date	Location	Notes
Loss	18–8–1	(Poland) Izuagbe Ugonoh	RTD	2 (10), 3:00	2018-05-25	(Poland) Stadion Narodowy, Warsaw	
Loss	18–7–1	(Poland) Tomasz Adamek	UD	10	2017-11-18	(Poland) Hala Sportowa, Czestochowa	For vacant Republic of Poland International heavyweight title
Loss	18–6–1	(United States) Jarrell Miller	RTD	3 (10), 3:00	2016-08-19	(United States) Rhinos Stadium, Rochester	For WBO-NABO heavyweight title
Loss	18–5–1	(United Kingdom) Hughie Fury	TD	7 (12), 0:46	2016-04-30	(United Kingdom) Copper Box Arena, Queen Elizabeth Olympic Park, Hackney Wick	For vacant WBO Inter-Continental heavyweight title; Unanimous TD
Loss	18–4–1	(United States) Dominic Breazeale	UD	10	2015-09-26	(United States) Legacy Arena, Birmingham	
Draw	18–3–1	(United States) Chris Arreola	MD	10	2015-07-18	(United States) Don Haskins Center, El Paso	
Loss	18–3	(United States) Amir Mansour	KO	7 (10), 2:14	2014-11-08	(United States) Sands Bethlehem Event Center, Bethlehem	
Win	18–2	(United States) Shannon Caudle	KO		2013-08-10	(United States) Crescent City Boxing Gym, New Orleans	
Win	17–2	(United States) Rubin Williams	TKO	2 (6), 2:28	2012-12-01	(United States) Crescent City Boxing Gym, New Orleans	
Win	16–2	(United States) Royphy Solieau	DQ		2012-04-14	(United States) Crescent City Boxing Gym, New Orleans	
Loss	15–2	(United States) Kendrick Releford	UD	10	2010-04-24	(United States) Hollywood Casino, Bay Saint Louis	
Win	15–1	(United States) Moises Droz	KO		2010-01-23	(United States) Hollywood Casino, Bay Saint Louis	
Win	14–1	(United States) Joseph Rabotte	UD		2009-12-04	(United States) St. Bernard Civic Center, Chalmette	
Win	13–1	(United States) Marvin Hunt	TKO		2009-10-03	(United States) Hollywood Casino, Bay Saint Louis	
Loss	12–1	(United States) Lionel Butler	SD	6	2009-09-10	(United States) San Manuel Indian Casino, Highland	
Win	12–0	(United States) Steve Lewallen	UD		2007-08-04	(United States) Expo Square Pavilion, Tulsa	
Win	11–0	(United States) Chaffy Uhde	RTD		2007-06-23	(United States) Convention Center, Fort Smith	
Win	10–0	(United States) Steven Crane	KO		2007-05-19	(United States) Gypsy, Fayetteville	
Win	9–0	(United States) Billy Deal	TKO		2007-04-14	(United States) The Hughes Center, Russellville	
Win	8–0	(United States) Ron Collins	TKO		2007-03-24	(United States) Oaks, Fort Smith	
Win	7–0	(United States) Jonathan Felton	UD		2007-02-23	(United States) Catholic Youth Center, Scranton	
Win	6–0	(United States) John Dixon	UD		2004-05-27	(United States) Alario Center, Westwego	
Win	5–0	(United States) Chris Gann	TKO		2004-05-21	(United States) The Foundry, Atlanta	
Win	4–0	(United States) Pavlo Varavko	UD		2004-04-03	(United States) Adam's Mark Hotel, Philadelphia	
Win	3–0	(United States) James Thompson	SD		2004-02-07	(United States) Ballys Park Place Hotel Casino, Atlantic City	
Win	2–0	(United States) Paul Tillery	UD		2003-12-13	(United States) Convention Center, Washington	
Win	1–0	(United States) Ken Powell	TKO		2003-12-02	(United States) Omni New Daisy Theater, Memphis	
