= Gerald Washington =

American politician

Gerald "Wash" Washington (c. 1949 – December 30, 2006) was a local politician and elected in 2006 as the first black mayor of Westlake, Louisiana, in the southwest part of the state. Having served three terms on the city council, he died of a single gunshot wound on December 30, 2006. He was scheduled to take office on January 2, 2007. The Calcasieu Parish coroner ruled that his death was a suicide, which the family rejected. A state police investigation also concluded he had died from suicide.

== Biography ==
Washington was a well-known and popular local political figure, having been elected and served three terms on the city council. He was a veteran of Vietnam and had a career with Conoco, retiring as a refinery supervisor.

Elected in the fall of 2006 as the first black mayor in the city's history, Washington was scheduled to take office on January 2, 2007. The city is majority white, and more than 80% of those who voted for him were white.

He was found dead at a school parking lot of a gunshot wound to the chest. His gun was found near his truck. The truck was described as sprayed with foam and washed by the fire department before it was returned to his family house.

The Calcasieu Parish coroner ruled the death a suicide, but his family believe it was a racially motivated assassination, as they said he received hate mail and threatening texts after his election. His son Geroski Washington said his father was a "joyful man", due to celebrate his 58th birthday and his mother's 93rd on January 6. The case attracted national coverage and attention; the National Conference of Black Mayors called for a thorough investigation.

Washington was determined to have died from a single gunshot from his own revolver, and powder was found deep in the wound. The coroner said this finding meant that the gun was pressed against his chest at the time it was shot, and suggested suicide.

His family accused the Sheriff's office of doing a poor job, and asked the state police to step in for a more thorough investigation.

The funeral was held for Washington on January 13, 2007, and he was buried at Perkins Cemetery. His many friends and allies in the city came out to honor him.

=== Findings on death ===
The state police report totalled more than 800 pages of documents, and included both additional physical evidence, such as the pattern of blood spatters indicating the fatal wound was self-inflicted, and investigation of possible motives. According to the investigation, Washington had lost hundreds of thousands of dollars from his retirement account in gambling, owed about $50,000 to the IRS, and had been sleepless and depressed in the weeks leading up to his death. The Calcasieu Parish District Attorney John DeRosier officially closed the investigation on March 29, 2007, concluding that Washington had killed himself.

The family acknowledged facts of financial and other issues, but contended that Washington was strongly Roman Catholic and would not have died from suicide. They had made arrangements for a third autopsy of Washington's body. They found suspicious the fact that the fire department had been called in to wash his truck off the night his body was found.
