= Wladimir Klitschko vs. Bryant Jennings =

Boxing competition

The Champion Returns
- Date: 25 April 2015
- Venue: Madison Square Garden, New York City, New York, USA
- Title(s) on the line: WBA (Unified), IBF, WBO, IBO, TBRB and The Ring unified heavyweight titles

Tale of the tape
Boxer	Wladimir Klitschko	Bryant Jennings
Nickname	Dr. Steelhammer	By-By
Hometown	Kyiv, Ukraine	Philadelphia, Pennsylvania, U.S.
Pre-fight record	63–3 (53 KO)	19–0 (10 KO)
Age	39 years, 1 month	30 years, 7 months
Height	6 ft 6 in (198 cm)	6 ft 3 in (191 cm)
Weight	241 1/2 lb (110 kg)	226 3/4 lb (103 kg)
Style	Orthodox	Orthodox
Recognition	WBA (Super), IBF, WBO, IBO, The Ring and TBRB; Heavyweight Champion; The Ring; No. 2 ranked pound-for-pound fighter	WBA; No. 2 Ranked Heavyweight; WBO; No. 3 Ranked Heavyweight; IBF; No. 4 Ranked Heavyweight; The Ring; No. 5 Ranked Heavyweight; TBRB; No. 8 Ranked Heavyweight

Result
- Klitschko wins via 12-round unanimous decision (Max DeLuca 118–109, Steve Weisfeld 116–111, Robin Taylor 116–111)

Wladimir Klitschko vs. Bryant Jennings, billed as The Champion Returns, was a heavyweight fight for the WBA (Super), IBF, WBO, IBO, and The Ring heavyweight titles. The fight took place on April 25, 2015, at Madison Square Garden in New York City.

This was the first time Klitschko had fought in the United States since 2008 and first time the lineal world heavyweight title was fought for in the United States since Lennox Lewis defeated Vitali Klitschko in 2003. His last fight in the United States was a title unification against Sultan Ibragimov. Klitschko won the fight by unanimous decision. This was also Klitschko's last professional win.

The fight aired on HBO.

== Build-up ==
On January 20, 2015 ESPN reported that the potential Klitschko vs. Jennings was confirmed and to take place on April 25, 2015. Negotiations initially started in November 2014. Klitschko's manager, Bernd Boente finally announced the fight and said all contracts had been signed.

Being Jennings first world title fight since turning professional in 2010, he spoke of his excitement, "I have all of the attributes naturally to be a champion that you can't teach – heart and will. I'm psyched up. This is the level where I'm at. This is exactly what I planned to do. Whatever competition you are in, your goal should be to reach the top. This is the top, but now it's about taking it to higher heights and winning." It was reported that Jennings was Deontay Wilder's mandatory challenger for the WBC title, but he gave up the opportunity to fight Klitschko instead.

Klitschko also spoke about the fight, "I do have great respect for Bryant Jennings and his achievements. He has good movement in the ring and good technique. I know this will be a tough challenge. I am extremely happy to fight in New York again. I had my first unification fight here and a lot of great heavyweight matches have taken place at Madison Square Garden. It will definitely be a great fight night and I will do everything for it from my side."

The Barclays Center in Brooklyn was originally chosen to stage the fight, but no reason was given for the change of venue. It would be the fourth time Wladimir would fight at the Garden.

== Fight details ==
Klitschko defeated Jennings by effective use of his jab and nullifying Jennings' offensive game on the inside, especially by holding Jennings, which resulted in the referee deducting a point in the 10th round for excessive holding, although Klitschko did end up winning via unanimous decision with scores of (116–111, 116–111, and 118–109) for his 18th successful title defense.

According to Compubox Stats, Klitschko landed 144 of his 545 punches thrown (26%) whilst Jennings landed 110 of 376 (29 percent).

== Aftermath ==
With this win, Klitschko defeated 23rd opponent for the world heavyweight championship, beating a record held by Joe Louis for 67 years. Klitschko also broke Muhammad Ali's record of the most wins in unified championship bouts in boxing history, gaining his 15th win. Klitschko reportedly earned $12.5 million for the fight. Klitschko would later face Tyson Fury and would suffer a shock unanimous decision loss. A planned rematch would fall through, and Wladimir would end up facing Anthony Joshua, losing by an 11th-round TKO. Klitschko retired after that fight meaning that the Jennings fight would be the final victory in his long career.

== Broadcasting ==
Country	Broadcaster
Germany	RTL
Hungary	DigiSport
Poland	PolSat
United Kingdom	BoxNation
United States	HBO

=== Viewership ===
According to Nielsen Media Research, the fight averaged 1.637 million viewers, peaking at 1.742 million viewers. The whole card averaged 1.3 million. The undercard fight between Ali and Santana averaged 1 million viewers.

== Fight card ==
Weight Class	Weight		vs.		Method	Round	Time	Notes
Heavyweight	Unlimited	(Ukraine) Wladimir Klitschko (c)	def.	(United States) Bryant Jennings	UD	12/12		^{Note 1}
Welterweight	147 lbs.	(United States) Sadam Ali	def.	(United States) Francisco Santana	UD	10/10		
Heavyweight	Unlimited	(United States) Charles Martin	def.	(United Kingdom) Tom Dallas	TKO	1/12		
Cruiserweight	200 lbs.	(Georgia (country)) Iago Kiladze	def.	(United States) Rayford Johnson	TKO	4/8		
Super Lightweight	140 lbs.	(United States) Kenneth Sims Jr	def.	(Puerto Rico) Luis Rodriguez	UD	6/6		

^Note 1 For WBA, WBO, IBF, The Ring and lineal heavyweight titles.

Preceded by vs. Kubrat Pulev	Wladimir Klitschko's bouts April 25, 2015	Succeeded by vs. Tyson Fury
Preceded by vs. Mike Perez	Bryant Jennings's bouts April 25, 2015	Succeeded by vs. Luis Ortiz
