= Wladimir Klitschko vs. Tyson Fury =

Boxing competition

Collision Course
- Date: 28 November 2015
- Venue: Esprit Arena, Düsseldorf, Germany
- Title(s) on the line: WBA (Unified), IBF, WBO, IBO, TBRB, and The Ring unified heavyweight titles.

Tale of the tape
Boxer	Wladimir Klitschko	Tyson Fury
Nickname	Dr. Steelhammer	The Gypsy King
Hometown	Kyiv, Ukraine	Manchester, England
Pre-fight record	64–3 (53 KO)	24–0 (18 KO)
Age	39 years, 8 months	27 years, 3 months
Height	6 ft 6 in (198 cm)	6 ft 9 in (206 cm)
Weight	245 lb (111 kg)	247 lb (112 kg)
Style	Orthodox	Orthodox
Recognition	WBA (Super), IBF, WBO, IBO, The Ring and TBRB; Heavyweight Champion; The Ring; No. 6 ranked pound-for-pound fighter	WBO; No. 1 Ranked Heavyweight; WBA/TBRB; No. 2 Ranked Heavyweight; IBF/The Ring; No. 3 Ranked Heavyweight

Result
- Fury wins via 12-round unanimous decision (115–112, 116–111, 115–112)

Wladimir Klitschko vs. Tyson Fury, billed as Kollisionskurs (German for Collision Course), was a professional boxing match contested between WBA (Unified), IBF, WBO, IBO, and The Ring heavyweight champion, Wladimir Klitschko, and Tyson Fury. The fight took place on 28 November 2015 at the Esprit Arena in Düsseldorf, Germany. Fury was declared the winner by unanimous decision. This ended Klitschko's reign of nearly 10 years, the second longest in heavyweight history.

Klitschko was contractually entitled to a rematch following the defeat, and announced his intention to have the rematch shortly after his defeat. The rematch would never occur, however, as Fury took a hiatus from boxing, next fighting in 2018, and Klitschko retired in 2017. Fury was stripped of the IBF title for agreeing to the rematch with Klitschko, and vacated the WBO and WBA titles in 2016.

== Background ==
In 2013, after he had defeated both Kevin Johnson and Steve Cunningham in world title eliminator fights, Tyson Fury repeated that he wanted to fight Wladimir Klitschko because he was the Number 1 in the division. He had previously called him out during video interviews, but believed that the Ukrainian would retire before facing him. Fury could have fought Kubrat Pulev for the mandatory slot to fight Klitschko in mid-2013, but chose to set up an all English showdown with David Haye because "it was a far bigger fight." After originally being scheduled for 28 September 2013, Haye pulled out a week before the fight with a cut above his eye that he said happened during sparring. After the fight was rescheduled for 8 February 2014, Haye pulled out for a second time after he underwent surgery on his shoulder. However, many people including Fury believed that Haye, who had already pulled out of a fight with Manuel Charr before Fury, had perhaps lost some of his passion for the sport and didn't want to fight because he feared losing, and was unnerved by Fury's attempts to sell the fight with his trash talk. Haye also reportedly said that he wasn't going to give Fury a pay day, a decision that would later come back to haunt him when he eventually made his return to boxing. After Fury defeated Klitschko, he stated that he would never give Haye the chance to fight him again after he let him down twice and wasted his time and money.

After nearly a year out of the ring as a result of the Haye saga, Fury knocked out Joey Abell in February 2014 and was then left to face Derek Chisora for a second time, in his third world title eliminator bout. He emerged comfortably as the winner, with Chisora retiring from the fight after the tenth round. Fury then defeated Christian Hammer in February 2015, whilst maintaining that he wanted to fight Klitschko and even though promoters were now sure that they could make the fight happen, Fury himself still believed that it was unlikely to be made.

Meanwhile, Klitschko had fought off several challengers to retain his world titles since his own victory over David Haye in 2011, which saw him win the WBA Super title, his fourth heavyweight belt out of the available five. His best victory since then had come over the then unbeaten Alexander Povetkin in 2013. Klitschko had been champion since he won the IBF and IBO belts for beating Chris Byrd in 2006. After defeating Bryant Jennings in April 2015, Klitschko acknowledged his next opponent should be Fury, saying that,

"I believe that the fight with Tyson Fury will look different to this one because of the size difference – Fury is taller than me. He is definitely the guy who is ambitious and I think it is going to be exciting. I think that he is going to engage in the fight. There was not much engagement through Jennings today but I think the Fury fight will be exciting and I’m looking forward to it."

After the fight was finally announced in July 2015 and scheduled originally for 24 October, Fury said,

‘The heavyweight division has been dull for over a decade, I’m going to shake it up and bring back the sparkle.’

The late Emanuel Steward, who had been Klitschko's trainer up until his death in 2012 and had also worked with Fury, had described Fury as "the next dominant heavyweight champion" and "the heir to Klitschko's throne."

The 39 year old Klitschko would go into the fight with a record of 64–3 and unbeaten in 11 years since his defeat by Lamon Brewster in 2004, while the 27 year old Fury was unbeaten with a record of 24–0.

== Build-up ==
The first press conference for the fight was held in Düsseldorf towards the end of July 2015, and Fury showed that despite this being the biggest fight of his career, his pre fight tactics wouldn't change. After Klitschko said that the fight was "nothing personal but business", Fury stated that it was personal because fighting is personal. He went on to launch a rant at Klitschko, calling him "boring" both in and out of the ring, and that he wanted to rid him and his jab and grab style out of the division. He also said that Klitschko, at 39 years of age, must be past his best and that he is no better than the great champions of the past, all of whom showed decline from Klitschko's age. He rounded off with a comical one liner when he said "The one thing I do know for sure is, this 'klit' is getting licked."

Klitschko himself drew comparisons between Fury and David Haye, saying that like Haye, Fury would be undergoing therapy when he fought him and after he had beaten him Fury would learn a lesson and become a better person. Fury said that he was nothing like Haye and shouldn't be compared to him, because "I'm not an idiot" or a "fraud", he also branded Haye a "bitch" and a "pussy" because he twice pulled out of fights against him.

In September, a second press conference was held in London and Fury upped the antics again, dressing up as the superhero Batman and flooring a villain in front of Klitschko in an attempt to unnerve him. Fury told Klitschko that he had dominated a weak era for heavyweights and that he had "reigned supreme over a load of bums". Fury also said that Klitschko could play the nice guy and the role model to try to get his television deals and sponsorships, "but quite frankly I don't care about all that stuff, all I care about is winning." Klitschko continued his talk of therapy, saying that Fury needed help, before telling Fury he was a clown and that he would get him a job at a circus after the fight. Fury continued the mind games by getting up from his chair and kicking it aside, challenging Klitschko to call him a clown again and shouting that he would fight him now and appeared to have to be restrained. Despite all this, there was still a handshake from the pair after an intense face off, with both men wishing each other good luck. Fury later stated that he didn't actually mind being called a clown, and that his act was all part of the entertainment that boxing needed.

The pair then met for a face to face interview 'The Gloves Are Off', and Klitschko stated that Fury tries to be a bully because inside he is weak and insecure, but Fury retorted that it was Klitschko who was insecure about Fury's unpredictable behaviour because he's a "control freak", who doesn't like it when he isn't in control of his opponent. Fury stated that Klitschko was the man standing in front of his entire future and he couldn't let the opportunity slip. He said, "the difference [between me and Klitschko] is that he's been made to look like that, everything he does is manufactured. Everything that I do is natural, off the cuff. Nobody tells me what to do, nobody sticks a key in my back and turns it. I do it myself. I wake up in the morning and do what I want to do, because I'm my own man. And when it comes to that night, I think the world will change because they'll have the most charismatic, the most colourful, the most controversial champion since Muhammad Ali. And that's what the world's been waiting for. If I'm not the man to fill those boots, they'll be waiting a hell of a lot time more. Because all I see is robots, people being turned and told what to say. So the world needs me to change the landscape of the division."

Fury also explained an infamous sauna incident at a Klitschko training camp in Austria in 2010, (the first time the pair had met) where according to Fury, "there were about 10 guys in the sauna, everyone started popping off around us and it came down to just me and Wlad in the sauna. In my mind I was mentally in a competition with him, he can deny it if he wants but I was prepared to die in that sauna, I stayed in for about 40 minutes, and he got out first." Klitschko claimed that he could remember the training camp and the sauna but not any mental competition, after Fury described the incident as a "mental victory." Klitschko said that he didn't know what Fury was talking about and that Fury, "built this in his own world and it didn't exist", but Fury replied "well you can say you don't know what I'm talking about, but we both know it did exist."

When discussing each other's boxing skills, Klitschko said that he thought Fury was a good counter puncher and moved well for a tall man. Meanwhile, Fury stated that although Klitschko had perfected a safe style and had immense power in right hand and left hook, he didn't know what he was in for because he was facing an opponent that was not only bigger than him but quicker, stating that he himself was blessed with unnatural speed and movement for a man of his size. When asked the question as to why the behaviour was so different to that of the press conference, Klitschko said "I'm not acting differently, Tyson acts differently because he's bipolar." Fury then replied, "maybe I am bipolar, who knows, but there's a time for play and there's a time for seriousness. Wladimir is not stupid, he knows I'm serious."

Fury once again mentioned Klitschko's age, telling him that he couldn't compete with a younger athlete, while Klitschko responded by saying that "age is just a number". Fury actually agreed, but still stated that at 40 years old, you can't do what you could do at 25. When asked whether he had been studying Klitschko's previous defeats, Fury said that he hadn't been because those losses were a long time ago and Klitschko had matured as a fighter since then. Fury said that unlike Klitschko's previous opponents, he genuinely believed he could beat him. Despite previously telling Klitschko he was going to knock him out, Fury revealed that (unlike David Haye in his opinion) he wasn't looking for that one punch and wasn't going to make the same mistake, and told Klitschko to expect something new. Also, unlike Haye, Fury shook Klitschko's hand when it was offered. Fury had also said to Klitschko that all he wanted him to do was "turn up and fight", to which Klitschko replied "I will, I'm looking forward to it" but Fury still believed that he may pull out. Ironically, within a couple of days Klitschko did pull out with a calf injury, and the fight on 24 October was cancelled and rescheduled for 28 November.

At the public training workout in Düsseldorf, Fury sang a version of "Wind Beneath My Wings" to Klitschko and his team, which Klitschko said he enjoyed. However, the Fury camp were not happy with the gloves the Klitschko camp had chosen, and threatened to pull out of the fight if it was not sorted out. An inspection of the ring also ended with layers of padding foam being removed from under the canvas.

== Fight details and aftermath ==
From the off, Fury kept constantly on the move boxing off the back foot and throwing many feints, beating Klitschko to the punch from range whilst not letting Klitschko set his feet to land his own shots. Despite the fact that it was usually Klitschko on the offensive coming towards him, Fury made himself difficult to be hit with his head and body movement, also switching to a southpaw stance at times to confuse Klitschko. Due to both fighter's style and defensive skill, there were very few punch combinations landed during the fight, when one punch was landed the next punches were nearly always evaded or missed.

Some of the rounds were close but were decisive in Fury's favor due to his ring generalship and being more active than Klitschko who appeared flustered. This gave Fury what was more or less an insurmountable lead going into the later rounds. From the start Fury's tactics appeared to be to try and nullify Klitschko and make him feel uncomfortable, even putting both his hands behind his back several times during the fight. As a result of this, Klitschko was noticeably gun shy during the fight, particularly with his right hand, seemingly wary of being countered.

Fury landed the best punch of the fight in the ninth round, after the pair had been holding Klitschko turned his back momentarily and when he turned to face Fury again he was caught with a left hook to the face, with Klitschko just managing to avoid some follow up punches. In the eleventh round, Fury landed another two big left hooks and Klitschko appeared to be hurt before referee Tony Weeks docked a point for a third punch that was behind the head having already warned Fury for rabbit punching. In the twelfth and final round Klitschko finally appeared to fight more aggressively, but Fury did the same and traded punches with him and although most scored the final round for Klitschko, when the bell sounded most people felt that Fury had done more than enough.

Two judges scored the bout 115–112, while the other scored it 116–111, all in favour of Fury which meant that he won by unanimous decision and became the new unified heavyweight champion. This nullified any fears that there could be a controversial, disputed or an unfair decision.

After the fight Fury apologised to Klitschko for some of his behaviour in the buildup, stating that he just wanted to be confident. Fury then celebrated by singing a version of Aerosmith's "I Don't Want to Miss a Thing" to his wife Paris.

In the post-fight press conference, Klitschko was asked whether his right hand was injured as he hadn't thrown it very often but he replied, "no it wasn't injured, but my right hand is supposed to land after my left, and I couldn't find the right distance to land the shots that I wanted." Fury's trainer and uncle Peter Fury said, "this is what we've been working on in the gym for five months, to beat someone like Wladimir Klitschko you have to take boxing to a whole new level." Klitschko congratulated Fury on winning the fight and Fury also gave credit to Klitschko for the shots he did land, saying that they both found each other awkward to land on. He then said "tonight was my night and God gave me the victory, so I hope to have many more defences of these titles. And if I could just say one thing, if I could be half as good a champion as Wladimir Klitschko, I'd be very very happy."

== Broadcasting ==
The fight was broadcast in countries across the world including by RTL in host country Germany, HBO in the United States and Sky Sports Box Office in the United Kingdom, where it saw over 500,000 pay per view buys. Viewing figures on HBO reached 1.714 million.

Country	Broadcaster
Germany	RTL
Hungary	Sport 1
United Kingdom	Sky Sports
United States	HBO

== Cancelled rematch ==
In December, Klitschko exercised his rematch clause, albeit without the IBF title at stake. This was due to Fury having to fight Klitschko as opposed to the IBF's mandatory challenger, Vyacheslav Glazkov. Instead Glazkov fought Charles Martin for the vacant title.

After months of negotiation, the Klitschko–Fury rematch was announced on 8 April 2016, with the fight scheduled to take place in the new champion's home town of Manchester at Manchester Arena on 9 July 2016. In the United Kingdom, the fight was to be shown live and exclusively on BoxNation. On 24 June 2016, Tyson Fury announced that the fight would be postponed due to an ankle sprain he received during training. He apologised to his fans and confirmed the fight would be rescheduled for a later date.

Also in June 2016, it was announced that Fury had tested positive for the banned substance nandrolone, a performance-enhancing drug, in his previous fight with Christian Hammer, which was held nine months prior to the Klitschko bout. Fury and his cousin Hughie Fury both tested positive for metabolites of the substance in urine samples taken in February 2015. Fury blamed the results on him eating uncastrated wild boar, denied any accusations he had cheated, and complained he was not notified about the test result until 14 months after it was taken. In December 2017, Tyson and Hughie received backdated two-year suspensions from UKAD. The report stated "UKAD's position is that the anti-doping rule violations it has asserted have been committed and the consequences set out in the UK Anti-Doping Rules should apply. Tyson and Hughie Fury's position is that they have never knowingly or deliberately committed any anti-doping rule violation."

On 7 July 2016, Fury announced that the rescheduled fight would take place on 29 October 2016 at Manchester Arena. It was confirmed officially on 7 September 2016.

On 23 September 2016, Fury again postponed the fight after being declared "medically unfit". On 12 October, Fury vacated the remaining titles, citing problems with depression after testing positive for cocaine.

After the rematch was cancelled, Klitschko agreed to fight IBF champion Anthony Joshua for the vacant WBA and IBO titles as well as Joshua's IBF title. The pair fought at Wembley Stadium in London on 27 April 2017, with Joshua winning by TKO in the eleventh round.

The vacant WBO title was fought for between WBO's number one ranked Joseph Parker and number three ranked Andy Ruiz on 10 December in Auckland, New Zealand, with Parker winning by majority decision.

Preceded by vs. Bryant Jennings	Wladimir Klitschko's bouts 28 November 2015	Succeeded by vs. Anthony Joshua
Preceded by vs. Christian Hammer	Tyson Fury's bouts 28 November 2015	Succeeded by vs. Sefer Seferi
Awards
Preceded by Ruslan Provodnikov vs. Chris Algieri	The Ring Upset of the Year; 2015	Succeeded by Andrzej Fonfara vs. Joe Smith Jr.
