= Vasiliy Lomachenko vs. Guillermo Rigondeaux =

2017 boxing match

- Date: December 9, 2017
- Venue: The Theater at Madison Square Garden, New York City, New York, U.S.
- Title(s) on the line: WBO Super featherweight title

Tale of the tape
Boxer	Vasiliy Lomachenko	Guillermo Rigondeaux
Nickname	"Hi-Tech"	El Chacal ("The Jackal")
Hometown	Bilhorod-Dnistrovskyi, Ukraine	Santiago de Cuba, Santiago de Cuba Province, Cuba
Pre-fight record	9–1 (7 KO)	17–0 (11 KO)
Age	29 years, 9 months	37 years, 2 months
Height	5 ft 6 in (168 cm)	5 ft 4 in (163 cm)
Weight	129 lb (59 kg)	128 1/2 lb (58 kg)
Style	Southpaw	Southpaw
Recognition	WBO; Super Featherweight Champion; The Ring/TBRB; No. 1 Ranked Super Featherweight; The Ring pound-for-pound No. 3 ranked fighter 2-division world champion	WBA (Super) and TBRB; Super Bantamweight Champion; The Ring; No. 1 Ranked Super Bantamweight; The Ring pound-for-pound No. 4 ranked fighter

Result
- Lomachenko wins via 6th-round RTD

Vasiliy Lomachenko vs. Guillermo Rigondeaux was a professional boxing match between world champions Vasiliy Lomachenko and Guillermo Rigondeaux for the WBO junior lightweight championship. The bout was held on December 9, 2017 at The Theater at Madison Square Garden in New York City. Lomachenko and Rigondeaux are regarded as two of the best amateurs in history, with each boxer winning two Olympic gold medals. It was the first time dual gold medal winners fought professionally, and it was a fight the great Roy Jones Jr. stated, "To me, on paper, this is the best professional fight that has ever been made." Lomachenko won by TKO when Rigondeaux retired on his stool after round 6 after claiming to have injured his left hand.

== Background ==
On August 6, Bob Arum stated that Lomachenko would fight for a third time in 2017, likely on December 9 or 23rd. When asked who the potential options were, Arum stated, ''Well, there's a few guys. Rigondeaux if he answers Dino (Duva's) call. There's (Orlando) Salido, who's sniffing around and the third is (Miguel) Berchelt." Arum also mentioned lightweight contender Ray Beltrán, but said he would like to capture a world title at lightweight before a potential fight with Lomachenko. On August 14, Arum spoke to LA Times and confirmed either Rigondeaux or Salido would be Lomachenko's next opponent. He stated if the bout with Rigondeaux was made, it would likely take place at The Theater at Madison Square Garden and a potential rematch with Salido would take place in Los Angeles. On August 21, Arum stated both camps were closing in on finalising a deal for December 9. On September 15, the bout between Lomachenko and Rigondeaux was confirmed. The fight between Lomachenko and Rigondeaux will take place at 130 pounds. On October 3, Arum stated there was less than a hundred tickets remaining and the event would go on to be the biggest live gate in the history of the Theatre. On November 18, Carl Moretti of Top Rank revealed a re-hydration clause on the contract. Both fighters agreed to weigh in at 09:00 on the morning of the fight, where they would not be able to exceed 138 pounds. Any fighter over the limit would face a penalty of more than $10,000. On November 28, the WBA announced that Rigondeaux would lose his title at super bantamweight if he lost to Lomachenko. WBA president Gilberto Mendoza Jr. went on to say if Rigondeaux defeats Lomachenko, he would have five days to decide whether he is to return to the division or stay at super featherweight. He stated that special permission was granted because the bout was 'an important fight for boxing'. Upon receiving the news, Rigondeaux took to Twitter and stated he was disappointed.

=== Promotion ===
On September 26, a promotional pre-sale began for tickets. Promoters, managers and boxers gave their thoughts on the fight.

The Lomachenko versus Rigondeaux title fight is a signature event in the sport of boxing. It matches the two greatest fighters in Olympic boxing facing off against each other. Never before in boxing history have two boxers, each the winner of two Olympic gold medals, faced each other in a professional boxing match.

— Bob Arum, Top Rank Promoter

It will be a big battle for boxing fans and boxing history. This battle will open our maximum potential. It will be the best New Year's present for boxing fanatics. Trust me on this one.

— Vasyl Lomachenko, WBO super featherweight champion

I am excited about Vasyl stepping back in the ring before the year is over. It is a great fight for all boxing lovers and the fans from around the world who asked for it. It is a historic bout for boxing, where for the first time two boxers, two world champions, each holding two Olympic gold medals, will meet in the professional ring. I am looking forward to seeing it.

— Egis Klimas, Lomachenko's manager

Regardless of weight class, Rigondeaux is ready to deliver an unforgettable performance.

— Roc Nation Sports promoter Michael Yormark

I'm thrilled to be part of this historic fight on ESPN because I've had my eye on fighting Vasyl Lomachenko for a long time. I'm thankful that Roc Nation Sports and Top Rank made this fight happen, and I can't wait to make a statement on Dec. 9 in New York City. Weight classes don't win fights -- fighters do. And I look forward to delivering the best performance of my career, beating a fellow legendary Olympian in Lomachenko and solidifying my place as one of the best pound-for-pound fighters of this era.

— Guillermo Rigondeaux, WBA & Lineal super bantamweight champion

This fight against Vasyl Lomachenko is the marquee challenge that Guillermo has been coveting, and we're grateful for Roc Nation Sports' hard work in making this a reality. Throughout Guillermo's career, he has never backed down from any fighter or weight-class restriction, so we're very excited to get to work. It's going to be a battle, but Guillermo will make Cuba, Miami and all of his fans worldwide proud when he beats Lomachenko on Dec. 9.

— Alex Bornote, Rigondeaux's manager

In an interview with BoxingScene.com, Roy Jones Jr. was also asked to give his thoughts on the fight.

That's the big one. I can't wait. I love both fighters. Both are two-time gold medalists. That's the best paper made fight ever. You can't find two fighters better on paper to put against each other. That's the best fight I ever seen made on paper, and I can't wait. Rigondeaux has got to box and break the rhythm of Lomachenko with those big power punches, and Lomachenko has to use that volume punching that he does to keep Rigondeaux off-balance. Whoever can carry out the plan will be the winner.

— Roy Jones Jr., former four-weight world champion

== Weights ==
=== Undercard ===
- Shakur Stevenson (125.2 pounds) vs. Oscar Mendoza (125.2 pounds)
- Michael Conlan (126.2 pounds) vs. Luis Fernando Molina (125.4 pounds)
- Christopher Diaz (129.4 pounds) vs. Bryant Cruz (132.6 pounds)

=== Main event ===
The official weigh in took place in the afternoon of December 8, 2017 in New York. Rigondeaux, who had never weighed more than 125½ pounds for a professional boxing match, came in a career-high 128.4 pounds. Lomachenko weighed in a 129 pounds, one pound under the super featherweight limit. It was noted, however, that the smaller, Rigondeaux appeared muscular and prepared for the biggest challenge of his professional career. On fight night, Lomachenko weighed 137.4 pounds and Rigondeaux weighed 130 pounds.

== The fight ==
In front of a sell out crowd of 5,102 at the Theater, Lomachenko retained his WBO title, forcing Rigondeaux to retire on his stool after round 6. Rigondeaux stated he had broken the top of his left hand in round two, which was the reason he did not come out for round 7. After a good first round in which Rigondeaux landed a few shots, he stopped punching from that point on. If the injury occurred, it might have taken place in the opening two rounds. Lomachenko did enough to win rounds between two and six. Rigondeax became Lomachenko's fourth consecutive opponent to retire on his stool. The loss also marked the first time Rigondeaux had lost since 2003, when he was still an amateur. At the time of stoppage, Lomachenko was ahead on all three judges' scorecards, 60-53, 59-54 and 59-54.

== Aftermath ==
In the post-fight interviews, Lomachenko was asked about Rigondeaux being his fourth consecutive opponent to retire on his stool, to which Lomachenko joked, "Maybe I should change my second name, now my name is 'No Mas Chenko'." He also went on to say, "This is not his weight, so it's not a big win for me. But he's a good fighter. He's got great skills. I adjusted to his style, low blows and all." Speaking to an interpreter, Rigondeaux said, "I lost, no excuses. I injured the top of my left hand in the second round. He's a very technical fighter. He's explosive. I'm gonna come back because that's what I do. The weight was not a factor in this fight. It was the injury to my hand." According to CompuBox statistics, Lomachenko landed 55 of 339 punches thrown (16%) and Rigondeax landed 15 of his 178 thrown (8%), landing no more than 3 punches per round. For the fight, Lomachenko was guaranteed a purse of $1.2 million whereas Rigondeaux earned a $400,000 purse. On December 12, Dino Duva of Roc Nation Sport, confirmed that Rigondeaux had bruised his hand and not fractured it, as initially stated.

== Fight card ==
Confirmed bouts:

Weight Class				Result	Round
Super featherweight	(Ukraine) Vasiliy Lomachenko (c)	def.	(Cuba) Guillermo Rigondeaux	RTD	6
Super featherweight	(Puerto Rico) Christopher Díaz	def.	(United States) Bryant Cruz	TKO	3
Heavyweight	(United States) Bryant Jennings	def.	(United States) Don Haynesworth	TKO	3
Featherweight	(United States) Shakur Stevenson	def.	(United States) Oscar Mendoza	TKO	2
Featherweight	(Republic of Ireland) Michael Conlan	def.	(Argentina) Luis Fernando Molina	UD	6
Super bantamweight	(United States) Jose Gonzalez	draw	(United States) Adan Gonzales	Majority draw	6
Lightweight	(United States) Mikaela Mayer	def.	(United States) Nydia Feliciano	MD	4

== Broadcast ==
The card was shown live on ESPN and ESPN Deportes in USA, and on Boxnation in the UK. The fight was also broadcast on Fox Sports in Australia.

=== Viewership ===
The fight was a huge ratings success on ESPN. For the year 2017, it finished behind Manny Pacquiao vs. Jeff Horn at second place, averaging 1.5 metered market rating and 2.114 million viewers. The whole card averaged 1.3 rating and 1.73 million viewers, which did not include ESPN Deportes or the online streaming service.

Preceded by vs. Miguel Marriaga	Vasiliy Lomachenko's bouts 9 December 2017	Succeeded by vs. Jorge Linares
Preceded by vs. Moises Flores	Guillermo Rigondeaux's bouts 9 December 2017	Succeeded by vs. Giovanni Delgado
