= Tom Dallas =

British boxer

Personal information
- Born: 23 April 1985 (age 41) Chatham, Kent, England
- Height: 6 ft 6 in (198 cm)
- Weight: Heavyweight

Boxing career
- Reach: 78 in (198 cm)
- Stance: Orthodox

Boxing record
- Total fights: 27
- Wins: 17
- Win by KO: 12
- Losses: 10
Medal record
Men's amateur boxing
English National Championships
Silver medal – second place	2006 London	Super-heavyweight

Tom Dallas (born 23 April 1985) is a British former professional boxer who competed from 2008 to 2017.

== Amateur career ==
Dallas represented his club, St. Mary's ABC, in the 2006 ABA Championships, losing to Derek Chisora in the final.

== Professional career ==
Dallas fought on the undercard of Wladimir Klitschko vs. Bryant Jennings and was part of the international television broadcast. In that fight he lost by way of a first round TKO to Charles Martin for the NABO Heavyweight Title.

Dallas also fought in the Prizefighter series.

== Professional boxing record ==
27 fights	17 wins	10 losses
By knockout	12	9
By decision	5	1

No.	Result	Record	Opponent	Type	Round, time	Date	Location	Notes
27	Loss	17–10	David Allen	TKO	3 (4), 0:37	22 Jul 2017	Brentwood Centre, Brentwood, England	
26	Loss	17–9	Adam Machaj	TKO	2 (4), 2:21	19 May 2017	Bolton Whites Hotel, Bolton, England	
25	Loss	17–8	Bill Hodgson	PTS	4	15 Apr 2017	Hilton Hotel, Blackpool, England	
24	Loss	17–7	Tom Little	TKO	1 (10), 0:59	11 Feb 2017	York Hall, London, England	
23	Loss	17–6	Igor Mihaljević	TKO	2 (6), 2:56	29 Oct 2016	Maidstone Leisure Centre, Maidstone, England	
22	Loss	17–5	Charles Martin	TKO	1 (10), 2:56	25 Apr 2015	Madison Square Garden, New York City, New York, U.S.	For WBO–NABO heavyweight title
21	Loss	17–4	Ian Lewison	TKO	2 (10), 1:18	7 Sep 2013	York Hall, London, England	For vacant Southern Area heavyweight title
20	Win	17–3	Tomas Mrazek	PTS	6	13 Jul 2013	York Hall, London, England	
19	Loss	16–3	Tor Hamer	TKO	1 (3), 0:29	20 Jun 2012	York Hall, London, England	Prizefighter 25: heavyweight semi-final
18	Win	16–2	Tom Little	TKO	3 (3), 1:52	20 Jun 2012	York Hall, London, England	Prizefighter 25: heavyweight quarter-final
17	Loss	15–2	Matt Skelton	TKO	5 (8), 1:00	3 Mar 2012	Hillsborough Leisure Centre, Sheffield, England	
16	Loss	15–1	David Price	TKO	2 (10), 2:45	11 Jun 2011	Liverpool Olympia, Liverpool, England	
15	Win	15–0	Zack Page	PTS	8	13 May 2011	Medway Park Sports Centre, Gillingham, England	
14	Win	14–0	Gabor Farkas	TKO	3 (6), 2:34	18 Mar 2011	Medway Park Sports Centre, Gillingham, England	
13	Win	13–0	Werner Kreiskott	KO	1 (6), 1:54	5 Feb 2011	Brentwood Centre, Brentwood, England	
12	Win	12–0	Paul Morris	TKO	3 (6), 2:55	16 Oct 2010	Troxy, London, England	
11	Win	11–0	Daniil Peretyatko	PTS	6	25 Jun 2010	Brentwood Centre, Brentwood, England	
10	Win	10–0	Lee Swaby	KO	1 (6), 1:54	14 May 2010	Goresbrook Leisure Centre, London, England	
9	Win	9–0	Yavor Marinchev	RTD	2 (6), 3:00	22 Jan 2010	Brentwood Centre, Brentwood, England	
8	Win	8–0	Jevgenijs Stamburskis	TKO	1 (6), 2:40	11 Dec 2009	Newport Centre, Newport, Wales	
7	Win	7–0	Mihaly Nemet	TKO	1 (6), 1:14	11 Sep 2009	Brentwood Centre, Brentwood, England	
6	Win	6–0	Stas Bilokon	TKO	2 (4), 2:13	30 Jun 2009	York Hall, London, England	
5	Win	5–0	Slavomir Selicky	TKO	1 (4), 1:18	23 Apr 2009	Troxy, London, England	
4	Win	4–0	Ben Harding	TKO	1 (4), 1:58	20 Mar 2009	Newham Leisure Centre, London, England	
3	Win	3–0	Howard Daley	TKO	2 (4), 2:07	15 Nov 2008	York Hall, London, England	
2	Win	2–0	Aleksandrs Selezens	PTS	4	17 Oct 2008	York Hall, London, England	
1	Win	1–0	Vlado Szabo	PTS	4	13 Sep 2008	York Hall, London, England	
