= Alexander Flores =

American boxer (born 1990)

Personal information
- Nickname: The Great
- Born: August 9, 1990 (age 36) Rowland Heights, California, U.S.
- Height: 6 ft 4 in (193 cm)
- Weight: Heavyweight

Boxing career
- Reach: 79 in (201 cm)
- Stance: Orthodox

Boxing record
- Total fights: 29
- Wins: 21
- Win by KO: 19
- Losses: 7
- Draws: 1

Alexander Flores (born August 9, 1990) is an American professional boxer who competes in the heavyweight division.

== Professional career ==
=== Boxing career ===
On August 18, 2011, Flores defeated Serhiy Karpenko by third round knockout at the Orange County Fairgrounds in Costa Mesa, California.

Unbeaten in his first 14 professional fights, he faced Charles Martin for the vacant WBO-NABO heavyweight title at Barker Hangar in Santa Monica, California, on April 16, 2014. He lost by knockout in the fourth round.

Flores took on former WBO heavyweight champion Joseph Parker at Horncastle Arena in Christchurch, New Zealand, on December 15, 2018, suffering a third round knockout defeat.

He was knocked out just 45 seconds into the first round by Luis Ortiz at Microsoft Theater in Los Angeles, California, on November 7, 2020. After the fight the California State Athletic Commission withheld Flores' $80,000 purse while an investigation took place into a possible lack of effort on his part. However, he was eventually cleared of any wrongdoing and his payment was released.

On April 24, 2026, he challenged WBC International heavyweight champion Andrii Novytskyi at Thunder Studios, Long Beach in California, losing by knockout in the fourth round.

Flores faced David Adeleye for the vacant WBA International heavyweight title at Dignity Health Sports Park in Carson, California, on November 14, 2026. He was knocked to the canvas in the third round and went on to lose via unanimous decision.

=== Triller Triad Combat ===
On November 27, 2021, Flores faced MMA fighter Matt Mitrione in a boxing vs MMA card promoted by Triller. Flores won the fight via unanimous decision.

== Professional boxing record ==
29 fights	21 wins	7 losses
By knockout	19	4
By decision	2	3
Draws	1	

No.	Result	Record	Opponent	Type	Round, time	Date	Location	Notes
29	Loss	21–7–1	David Adeleye	UD	10	Nov 14, 2026	Dignity Health Sports Park, Carson, California, U.S.	For vacant WBA International heavyweight title
28	Loss	21–6–1	Andrii Novytskyi	KO	4 (10), 2:10	Apr 24, 2026	Thunder Studios, Long Beach, California, U.S.	For WBC International heavyweight title
27	Win	21–5–1	Cassius Chaney	RTD	7 (10), 3:00	Jan 30, 2026	Thunder Studios, Long Beach, California, U.S.	
26	Win	20–5–1	Juan Torres	KO	1 (8), 0:52	Sep 20, 2025	Gimnasio Nacional Jose Adolfo Pineda, San Salvador, El Salvador	
25	Loss	19–5–1	Tsotne Rogava	UD	10	Sep 28, 2024	Pacific Palms Resort, City of Industry, California, U.S.	For vacant WBC USA heavyweight title
24	Win	19–4–1	Josue Vargas	KO	3 (6), 2:15	Mar 23, 2024	LumColor "Phoenix Center", Ontario, California, U.S.	
23	Loss	18–4–1	Dante Stone	UD	8	Jan 4, 2024	Emerald Queen Casino, Tacoma, Washington, U.S.	
22	Loss	18–3–1	Luis Ortiz	KO	1 (10), 0:45	Nov 7, 2020	Microsoft Theater, Los Angeles, U.S.	
21	Win	18–2–1	Mario Heredia	TKO	6 (10), 1:33	Nov 7, 2019	Casino Del Sol, Tucson, Arizona, U.S.	
20	Loss	17–2–1	Joseph Parker	KO	3 (12), 2:51	Dec 15, 2018	Horncastle Arena, Christchurch, New Zealand	
19	Win	17–1–1	Misael Sanchez	TKO	1 (8), 1:49	Jun 2, 2018	Bar La Oficina, Tijuana, Mexico	
18	Win	16–1–1	Jorge Alfredo Leal	KO	1 (8), 1:37	Feb 23, 2017	Escape Bar, Tijuana, Mexico	
17	Win	15–1–1	Roman Borquez	KO	2 (8), 1:58	Nov 7, 2015	Salon Mezzanine, Tijuana, Mexico	
16	Draw	14–1–1	Avery Gibson	SD	6	Oct 16, 2014	The Hangar, Costa Mesa, California, U.S.	
15	Loss	14–1	Charles Martin	KO	4 (10), 1:14	Apr 16, 2014	Barker Hangar, Santa Monica, California, U.S.	For vacant WBO-NABO heavyweight title
14	Win	14–0	Arron Lyons	KO	8 (8), 2:04	Dec 5, 2013	Orange County Fair, Costa Mesa, California, U.S.	
13	Win	13–0	Keith Barr	TKO	4 (8), 1:12	May 16, 2013	Lakeside Golf Course, Burbank, California, U.S.	
12	Win	12–0	Harold Sconiers	TKO	1 (8), 2:29	Feb 28, 2013	The Hangar, Costa Mesa, California, U.S.	
11	Win	11–0	Matt Hicks	RTD	1 (6), 3:00	Dec 6, 2012	Orange County Fair, Costa Mesa, California, U.S.	
10	Win	10–0	Henry Namauu	TKO	8 (8), 1:00	Aug 16, 2012	Orange County Fair, Costa Mesa, California, U.S.	
9	Win	9–0	Joey Montoya	RTD	5 (8), 3:00	May 17, 2012	Lakeside Golf Course, Burbank, California, U.S.	Won vacant WBC Youth heavyweight title
8	Win	8–0	Giovanni Sarran	KO	2 (6), 2:47	Apr 12, 2012	Orange County Fair, Costa Mesa, California, U.S.	
7	Win	7–0	Kelsey Arnold	KO	1 (6), 2:51	Dec 1, 2011	Orange County Fair, Costa Mesa, California, U.S.	
6	Win	6–0	Chad Davis	RTD	1 (6), 3:00	Oct 27, 2011	San Manuel Indian Casino, Highland, California, U.S.	
5	Win	5–0	Serhiy Karpenko	KO	3 (6), 2:59	Aug 18, 2011	Orange County Fair, Costa Mesa, California, U.S.	
4	Win	4–0	Quadtrine Hill	UD	4	Apr 8, 2011	Buffalo Bill's Star Arena, Primm, Nevada, U.S.	
3	Win	3–0	Cornell Davis	UD	4	Oct 22, 2010	Quiet Cannon, Montebello, California, U.S.	
2	Win	2–0	Richard Hale	KO	2 (4), 1:15	Jun 3, 2010	Commerce Casino, Commerce, California, U.S.	
1	Win	1–0	Antonio Robertson	KO	2 (4), 1:11	Mar 19, 2010	Quiet Cannon, Montebello, California, U.S.	
