= Anthony Joshua vs Wladimir Klitschko =

Boxing match

- Date: 29 April 2017
- Venue: Wembley Stadium, Brent, London, United Kingdom
- Titles on the line: IBF and vacant WBA (Super), and IBO heavyweight titles

Tale of the tape
| Boxer | Anthony Joshua | Wladimir Klitschko |
| Nickname | AJ | Dr. Steelhammer |
| Hometown | London, England | Kyiv, Ukraine |
| Pre-fight record | 18–0 (18 KOs) | 64–4 (53 KOs) |
| Age | 27 years, 6 months | 41 years, 1 month |
| Height | 6 ft 6 in (198 cm) | 6 ft 6 in (198 cm) |
| Weight | 250 lb (113 kg) | 240 lb (109 kg) |
| Style | Orthodox | Orthodox |
| Recognition | IBF; Heavyweight Champion; TBRB; No. 1 Ranked Heavyweight; The Ring; No. 5 Ranked Heavyweight | WBA; No. 2 Ranked Heavyweight; IBF; No. 3 Ranked Heavyweight; The Ring; No. 1 Ranked Heavyweight; Former unified heavyweight champion |

Result
- Joshua wins via 11th-round technical knockout

Anthony Joshua vs Wladimir Klitschko was a professional boxing match contested on 29 April 2017 at Wembley Stadium in London, with Joshua's IBF and the vacant WBA (Super) and IBO heavyweight titles on the line. Joshua won the match via technical knockout (TKO) in the eleventh round with 90,000 fans in attendance. Klitschko announced his retirement from boxing a few months after the fight. The bout was named Fight of the Year by The Ring and the Boxing Writers Association of America.

== Background ==
It was announced in August 2016 that Anthony Joshua would be making a second defence of his IBF title at the Manchester Arena on 26 November. This would mark the first time since September 2014 that Joshua would be fighting in the city. Possible names put forward for the fight were top IBF contenders Kubrat Pulev, Bermane Stiverne, Hughie Fury and Joseph Parker. Former unified heavyweight champion Wladimir Klitschko became the frontrunner after his scheduled rematch with Tyson Fury was cancelled for a second time.

Days after the Fury rematch was called off, Klitschko was approached by Joshua's promoter, Eddie Hearn. Terms seemed to have been agreed for a £30m showdown, although an initial contract was yet to be signed. After Fury gave up his world titles, it was said that Klitschko wanted the WBA title on the line in the potential match up against Joshua. The WBA delayed sanctioning the fight due to having a legal settlement with Lucas Browne, who was next in line to fight for the vacant title. Klitschko then turned his attention to fighting Browne instead on 10 December, a date that his team had booked for an arena in Germany. A deal could not be finalised for Joshua vs. Klitschko, due to the WBA delaying a decision to sanction the fight and Klitschko injuring himself, which put the fight off completely. Klitschko said he would be looking to fight Joshua in the first quarter of 2017. Talks between the Klitschko camp and Hearn remained active with a fight set for the first part of 2017.

Bryant Jennings and David Price were the names being pushed forward to fight Joshua next, however it was announced Joshua would be fighting at the Manchester Arena, defending his title against former world title challenger Éric Molina (25–3, 19 KOs), who was coming off a stoppage victory against Tomasz Adamek. On 2 November, the WBA finally agreed to sanction a fight for their super title as long as Joshua defeats Molina in December 2016. The fight was televised in the United States live on Showtime. After two one sided rounds, which saw Molina hardly throw anything, Joshua knocked Molina out in the third round.

Immediately after Joshua the win, Klitschko was invited into the ring by Hearn. It was announced that Joshua and Klitschko would face each other for the IBF and vacant WBA (Super) titles at Wembley Stadium, London, on 29 April 2017. WBA president Gilberto J. Mendoza confirmed that the winner would have to face mandatory challenger Luis Ortiz next, with deadlines due to be set after the unification fight. It was then confirmed that the winner between Joshua and Klitschko had to face Kubrat Pulev next as the IBF's mandatory challenger.

=== Build-up ===
In January 2017, Eddie Hearn announced that more than 80,000 tickets had been sold, a new box office record, overtaking Carl Froch vs. George Groves II. He put a request in for 5,000 more tickets to be made available. London Mayor Sadiq Khan cleared the way for a crowd of 90,000, equalling the British record of Len Harvey and Jock McAvoy set in 1939 and making it the biggest crowd for a heavyweight fight in 90 years.

The fight build-up was noted for the humility shown from both boxers, with the lack of trash talk described as being refreshing.

The bout was predicted to generate the biggest betting turnover in sports history at £100 million, with £20 million coming from the UK.

== The fight ==
In front of a post-war record crowd of 90,000 in attendance, Joshua won by technical knockout (TKO) in the eleventh round. They fought a close and cautious first four rounds. In the fifth, Joshua came out and sent Klitschko to the canvas with a barrage of punches. Klitschko rose up and took control for the remainder of the round and scoring his own knockdown in round six. The next few rounds were again cautious, both men wary of each other, until a reinvigorated Joshua attacked Klitschko in round eleven, sending him to the canvas. Klitschko again rose but Joshua knocked him down for a second time in the round, then sent a barrage of punches while Klitschko was against the ropes that made the referee stop the fight.

At the time of stoppage, Joshua was ahead on two judges' scorecards with 96–93 and 95–93, while the third judge had Klitschko ahead at 95–93. CompuBox stats showed that Joshua landed 107 of his 355 punches thrown (30%), and Klitschko landed 94 of 256 (37%). Joshua called out Tyson Fury in the post fight interview, "Tyson Fury, where you at, baby? Come on -- that's what they want to see. I just want to fight everyone. I'm really enjoying this right now."

== Reception ==
Prior to the fight, Deutsche Welle called it "the most anticipated boxing match in decades".

After the bout, the fight was met with critical acclaim. Both fighters were praised for their performances, with many critics and fans believing that the fight lived up to and exceeded expectations. The fight, according to The Economist, "will be remembered as a spectacular one, perhaps even as a classic, for its dramatic swings in momentum and the ferocity of the punching" and for waking heavyweight boxing "from a prolonged slumber" during the years of unrivalled Klitschko dominance. ESPN.com called it "the biggest heavyweight fight since Lennox Lewis knocked out Mike Tyson". Associated Press called it "the biggest heavyweight title fight in more than a decade".

== Aftermath ==
In the press conference after the fight, Joshua said he would have no issues with having another fight with Klitschko: "I don't mind fighting him again, if he wants the rematch. Big respect to Wladimir for challenging the young lions of the division. It's up to him, I don't mind. As long as Rob thinks it's good, I'm good to go." Hearn said Joshua's next fight would likely take place at the end of the year, possibly at the Principality Stadium in Cardiff. On 3 August 2017, Klitschko announced on his official website and social media channels that he was retiring from boxing.

== Fight card ==
Confirmed bouts:

| Weight class | | vs. | | Method | Round | Time | Notes |
|---|---|---|---|---|---|---|---|
| Heavyweight | (United Kingdom) Anthony Joshua (c) | def. | (Ukraine) Wladimir Klitschko | TKO | 11/12 | 2:25 | ^{Note 1} |
| Featherweight | (United Kingdom) Scott Quigg | def. | (Romania) Viorel Simion | UD | 12 | 3:00 |
| Lightweight | (United Kingdom) Luke Campbell | def. | (Colombia) Darleys Pérez | TKO | 9/12 | 1:28 |
| Women's lightweight | (Republic of Ireland) Katie Taylor | def. | (Germany) Nina Meinke | TKO | 7/10 | 0:57 | ^{Note 2} |
| Super featherweight | (United Kingdom) Joe Cordina | def. | (Germany) Sergej Vib | TKO | 1/4 | 1:59 |

^Note 1 For IBF, vacant WBA (Super), and IBO heavyweight titles
^Note 2 For vacant WBA female Inter-Continental lightweight title

== Broadcasting ==
The domestic television rights to the fight were held by Sky Sports Box Office pay-per-view, while radio rights were held by BBC Radio 5 Live. In the United States, as rights to Joshua and Klitschko's fights have historically been held by the two networks respectively, an arrangement was made for both Showtime and HBO to hold rights to this fight. In a contrast to Floyd Mayweather Jr. vs. Manny Pacquiao, which was broadcast via a PPV jointly produced by both networks, HBO and Showtime produced their own separate telecasts as part of their respective HBO World Championship Boxing and Showtime Championship Boxing brands, and Showtime beat HBO for exclusive rights to broadcast the fight live in the U.S. (where it occurred in the afternoon in the Eastern Time Zone). Likewise, HBO broadcast the bout on tape delay later in the night.

Joshua's promoter Eddie Hearn stated that "it takes a special fight to break down barriers and boundaries but also networks and executives who believe in working with the best interest of fight fans in mind", and thanked both networks "for their perseverance and allowing America to see one hell of a fight at our national stadium."

The fight's cumulative worldwide audience is estimated to be 500 million viewers. In the United Kingdom, the fight set a domestic PPV record, with 1.532 million buys, exceeding the Mayweather vs. Pacquiao fight. At a viewing price of £20 ($26), the Joshua–Klitschko fight grossed approximately £31 million ($40 million) in pay-per-view revenue. In total, the fight generated an estimated £50 million ($68 million) in revenue from all sources, including live gate, pay-per-view, and overseas broadcasting.

In the U.S., the fight averaged 659,000 viewers on Showtime; Nielsen reported that the fight peaked between rounds five and six with 687,000 viewers, beating a record for Showtime afternoon fight ratings previously set by Joshua. The delayed broadcast on HBO (which fell during U.S. nighttime) was seen by an average of 738,000 viewers and peaked at 890,000.

In a press release, German TV channel RTL announced the fight was watched by an average 9.59 million viewers. At its peak, the fight was watched by 10.43 million viewers. This was higher than the 8.91 million that tuned in to watch Klitschko vs. Fury in 2015. It did lower numbers than Klitschko's win over Mariusz Wach in 2012, which was watched by 11 million and Klitschko vs. Haye, which was seen by over 16 million. In Ukraine, the match averaged 4.4 million viewers, becoming the most watched sporting event of 2017 in the country.

| Country | Broadcaster |
|---|---|
| Albania | SuperSport |
| Argentina | TyC Sports |
| Austria | RTL |
| Australia | Main Event |
| Belgium | VOOsport |
| Bulgaria | Sport+ HD |
| Canada | HBO Canada |
| Croatia | RTL Televizija |
| Czech Republic | Nova Sport 1 |
| Denmark | Viaplay |
| Estonia | Viasat Sport Baltic |
| Finland | Viaplay |
| France | SFR Sport |
| Germany | RTL |
| Greece | ANT1 (broadcast delay) |
| Hungary | Sport1 |
| Indonesia | Kompas TV |
| Ireland | Sky Box Office |
| Italy | Sky Sport Plus; Fox Sports |
| Japan | WOWOW Live |
| Latvia | Viasat Sport Baltic |
| Liechtenstein | RTL |
| Lithuania | Viasat Sport Baltic |
| Mexico | TV Azteca |
| Moldova | Pro TV |
| Netherlands | RTL 7 |
| New Zealand | SKY Arena |
| Norway | Viaplay |
| Philippines | TV5 |
| Poland | Polsat Sport |
| Romania | Pro TV; Sport.ro |
| Russia | Match TV; Match!Boets |
| Serbia | RTS |
| Slovakia | Dajto |
| Slovenia | RTL |
| South Africa | Soweto TV |
| Spain | Movistar+ |
| Sweden | Viaplay |
| Switzerland | RTL |
| Tajikistan | Varzish Sport |
| Turkey | Tivibu Spor |
| Ukraine | Inter |
| United Arab Emirates | OSN Sports |
| United Kingdom | Sky Box Office |
| United States | Showtime (exclusive live rights); HBO (tape delayed) |
| Uzbekistan | Uzreport TV |
| Sub-Saharan Africa | Kwesé Sports |

| Preceded by vs. Éric Molina | Anthony Joshua's bouts 29 April 2017 | Succeeded by vs. Carlos Takam |
| Preceded by vs. Tyson Fury | Wladimir Klitschko's bouts 29 April 2017 | Retired |
Awards
| Previous: Francisco Vargas vs. Orlando Salido | The Ring Fight of the Year; 2017 | Succeeded by Canelo Álvarez vs. Gennady Golovkin II |
| Previous: Francisco Vargas vs. Orlando Salido | Ali–Frazier Award; 2017 | Succeeded by Erislandy Lara vs. Jarrett Hurd |
