= Luis Ortiz (Cuban boxer) =

Cuban boxer (born 1979)

Personal information
- Nickname: King Kong
- Born: 29 March 1979 (age 47) Camagüey, Cuba
- Height: 6 ft 4 in (193 cm)
- Weight: Heavyweight

Boxing career
- Reach: 84 in (213 cm)
- Stance: Southpaw

Boxing record
- Total fights: 40
- Wins: 35
- Win by KO: 30
- Losses: 3
- No contests: 2
Medal record
Men's amateur boxing
Representing Cuba
World Cup
| Silver medal – second place | 2005 Moscow | Heavyweight |

Luis Ortiz (born 29 March 1979) is a Cuban professional boxer. He held the WBA interim heavyweight title from 2015 to 2016, and challenged twice for the WBC heavyweight title in 2018 and 2019. As an amateur, he won a silver medal at the 2005 Boxing World Cup. Nicknamed "King Kong", he is known for his formidable punching power. As of November 2021, he was ranked as the world's eighth-best active heavyweight by The Ring magazine and the Transnational Boxing Rankings Board.

== Amateur career ==
Ortiz was a longtime member of the Cuban national team without succeeding at the top international level.

Cuban Championships medals

- 2002 – silver medal, 95 kg
- 2003 – bronze medal, 91+ kg
- 2005 – silver medal, 91 kg
- 2006 – gold medal, 91 kg
- 2008 – white ribbon, 91+ kg

International results

- 2005 – Panamerican Championships, Brazil – gold medal, 91 kg
- 2005 – World Cup (team competition), Russia – silver medal, 91 kg
- 2005 – World Championships, China – quarter-finalist, 91 kg

Ortiz had an amateur record of 343–19.

== Professional career ==
=== Early career ===
A 30 year old Ortiz made his debut on 16 February 2010, against American boxer Lamar Davis (4–1, 1 KO) in a scheduled 4 round bout at the Seminole Hard Rock Hotel and Casino in Hollywood, Florida. Ortiz won the fight via technical knockout (TKO) in just under 80 seconds in round 1. Ortiz fought again at the Seminole Hard Rock Hotel and Casino for his second professional fight on 15 June against 39 year old Charles Davis. Ortiz won via TKO in round 4. In his third pro fight, Ortiz claimed the vacant WBC FECARBOX heavyweight title against 28 year old Kendrick Releford (22–13–2, (10 KOs) on 24 August 2010. Releford was knocked down once in round 2, as Ortiz won the fight via 8 round unanimous decision 80–72, 79–72, and 79–72. Ortiz won his next 2 bouts via eighth-round stoppage against Zack Page and Francisco Álvarez (12–1, 10 KO), improving his record to 5 wins in as many fights, with 4 coming within the distance. Ortiz fought at the Double Tree Westshore Hotel in Tampa, Florida on 28 January 2011, against Rubén Rivera (3–5, 1 KO). Rivera was deducted 2 points in round 4 and then disqualified in round 5 for repeated low blows.

=== Regional success ===
Ortiz fought twice in April, first defeating Jerry Butler via third-round TKO and then knocking out former world title challenger Bert Cooper (38–22, 31 KOs) within 2 rounds. Ortiz then fought 27 year old Corey Winfield (4–7, 2 KOs) in May at the Rec Center in Wilson, North Carolina. Ortiz won the bout via knockout in round 3. On 3 June, Ortiz fought at the A La Carte Event Pavilion in Tampa, Florida against 36 year old Jason Barnett (12–13, 6 KOs), winning the bout via first-round TKO, knocking Barnett down twice. Ortiz fought two weeks later on the undercard of the Gennady Golovkin vs Kassim Ouma middleweight title fight at the Arena Roberto Durán in Panama, against former cruiserweight world title challenger Luis Andres Pineda (22–9–1, 18 KOs). This was for the WBC FECARBOX heavyweight title as well as the vacant WBA Fedelatin heavyweight title. Ortiz won the bout, stopping Pineda in round 6. A month later, Ortiz defended the WBA Fedelatin heavyweight title against Henry Saenz (22–8–1, 18 KOs) at the Gimnasio Nacional in San José, Costa Rica. Ortiz won the fight via third-round TKO.

In February 2012, Ortiz fought 36 year old Epifanio Mendoza (32–13–1, 28 KOs) at the Community Center in Florida for the vacant WBO and WBC Latino heavyweight titles in a scheduled 10 round fight. Ortiz won the fight in round 7, after Mendoza was disqualified for an intentional low blow. Towards the end of October, Ortiz fought three times in the space of 18 days in the Dominican Republic. He knocked out Jose Santos Peralta in 2 minutes and 24 seconds of round 1, beat debutant Juan Carlos Antonio Maldonado via first-round TKO and knocked out Santiago De Paula in 4 rounds.

After an 8-month lay off, Ortiz fought in July 2013 against Joseph Rabotte, who was on a 10 fight losing streak. Officially announced as a third-round knockout, the North Carolina Athletic Commission overturned the KO on appeal, ruling that Rabotte accidentally fell out of the ring, resulting in a 'No-Contest' as the bout ended before the start of round 4, which meant the bout could not go to the scorecards. On 3 April 2014, in what was considered as his best and most known opponent in his career to date, Ortiz fought 42 year old former world title challenger Monte Barrett (35–10–2, 20 KOs) at the Fantasy Springs Casino in Indio, California. Barrett, who was taking this fight on short notice, was hit with a left hand on the nose and went down on his right knee after which referee Caiz stopped the bout without a count. Barrett announced his retirement after this loss. Ortiz landed 49 punches from 137 thrown while Barrett connected 24 of 83 punches thrown.

==== Ortiz vs. Kayode ====
In August 2014, it was reported by Boxing Scene that Ortiz would get his first world title opportunity, fighting for the vacant WBA interim heavyweight title against the undefeated former cruiserweight contender Lateef Kayode (20–0, 16 KOs) on 11 September at the Hard Rock Hotel & Casino in Las Vegas, Nevada. The card was to be televised on Fox Sports 1. Ortiz knocked down Lateef Kayode in the first round to win the Interim WBA heavyweight title. After Ortiz landed 15 unanswered punches on Kayode, the referee waved off the fight. After the bout, Kayode claimed the knockdown was a slip, and stated the stoppage was premature. However, Ortiz tested positive for a banned substance after the fight.

On 27 October 2014, the Nevada State Athletic Commission postponed the taking of a decision to potentially change the result to a no-contest until a full hearing was held, as Ortiz was not yet ready to testify on that date.

After a 9-month suspension, Ortiz fought on the undercard of world middleweight title fight Lemieux–N'Dam N'Jikam on 20 June 2015, at the Bell Centre in Montreal, Canada, against 35 year old American Byron Polley (27–18–1, 12 KOs). Ortiz won via first-round TKO.

=== WBA interim heavyweight champion ===
==== Ortiz vs. Vidondo ====
A year after being stripped, Ortiz had a second chance of becoming Interim world champion, this time against Argentine Matias Ariel Vidondo on the undercard of Golovkin vs. Lemieux on 17 October at Madison Square Garden, New York City. Ortiz was supposed to face former WBC champion Bermane Stiverne (24–2–1, 21 KOs), but Stiverne's promoter Don King declined to sign the contract after the deal had been agreed. Golden Boy Promotions then signed relative unknown 38 year old Vidondo for the fight. Vidondo was down once in round two after being rocked with a left hand late in the round. Ortiz won the bout via KO in the third round, after sending him to the mat with a powerful right hook. Following the stoppage, Ortiz climbed to the top rope doing his trademark chest beating.

==== Ortiz vs. Jennings ====
On 21 October 2015, HBO announced that Ortiz would have his first real test against former world title challenger Bryant Jennings (19–1, 10 KOs) on 19 December at the Turning Stone Casino, Verona, New York. The fight was initially being pushed for the Golovkin vs. Lemieux undercard, however a deal was not reached. Ortiz won the bout via TKO in the seventh round to successfully retain his interim title. Ortiz's power was too much for Jennings as he repeatedly hurt him early in the fight. After four rounds of back and forth action, Ortiz seemed to take over in the fifth, finishing Jennings off in round seven with a vicious left uppercut that sent the former world title challenger face down on the canvas. After the fight, Ortiz called out fellow heavyweights Deontay Wilder, Tyson Fury and Wladimir Klitschko, stating he was ready to prove himself as the best in the division. This was the first time Ortiz headlined a card on HBO Boxing After Dark, which averaged 616,000 viewers, reaching a peak 735,000 viewers. This was Jennings’ first stoppage loss in his professional career. Ortiz improved his record to 24–0 with 21 knockouts and ranked at #1 by the WBA.

==== Ortiz vs. Thompson ====
On 9 February 2016, it was announced that Ortiz would defend his WBA Interim title against veteran heavyweight Tony Thompson (40–6, 27 KOs) at the DC Armory, in Washington on 5 March. Ortiz stated it was "just another stepping stone on my path to becoming the unified heavyweight world champion." It was later announced on 1 March, that this bout would no longer be for the WBA Interim title, simply because Thompson wasn't ranked in the top 15 by the WBA at the time. Thompson had lost three out of his last five fights, with his last outing a points decision defeat to Malik Scott in October 2015. Thompson was also beaten by Carlos Takam and Kubrat Pulev in the last three years. On fight night, in front of 4,585 in attendance, Ortiz knocked Thompson down in rounds 1, 3 and 6. Thompson got up, but the referee Malik Waleed stopped the contest. The judges had Ortiz ahead on all scorecards at the time of stoppage 50–43, 48–47, and 50–43. The fight was shown live on HBO Boxing After Dark and averaged 740,000 viewers and peaked at 807,000 viewers. This was an increase from his previous fight against Jennings.

==== Cancelled defences ====
After Ortiz defeated Jennings, the WBA had wanted Golden Boy Promotions to put together a fight between Ortiz and #5 WBA ranked contender Alexander Ustinov. Initially the fight looked as though it wouldn't happen, and Ortiz fought Thompson instead. However, in May 2016 an announcement was made that a deal was in place for Ortiz to face Ustinov in the United States with the fight to be shown on HBO, who had also broadcast Ortiz last two fights. The fight was to take place on the undercard of Saul Alvarez's next fight on September 17 at the AT&T Stadium, Arlington, Texas. The winner would be a step closer to a world title shot against the winner of the rematch between Tyson Fury and Wladimir Klitschko, which was eventually cancelled after Fury was declared 'medically unfit'. According to Ustinov's promoter, Vladimir Hryunov, the fight was pulled from the card on 2 August, stating Ortiz was 'problematic and imploded the whole fight'. WBA ordered a purse bid to take place on 15 August at its offices in Panama City with the minimum bid being $600,000. Ortiz entitled to 60 percent, meaning he would earn at least $360,000, and Ustinov entitled to 40 percent, at least $240,000.

It was confirmed in October that a deal had been reached for Ortiz to defend his interim WBA title against French heavyweight Carlos Takam on 12 November in Monte Carlo. However it was later announced that Takam would next fight Johann Duhaupas for the WBC Silver title.

=== Signing with Matchroom ===
Ortiz signed a lucrative deal with Eddie Hearn's Matchroom Sport on 9 October 2016, believing it to be the 'fastest way to stardom'. With this deal, Ortiz became the first foreign boxer to sign with the promotion. The deal was later revealed to be on a fight by fight basis.

The following day it was confirmed that Ortiz would be fighting for the vacant WBA Inter-continental heavyweight title in the ‘Monte-Carlo Boxing Bonanza’ main event against American Malik Scott (38–2–1, 13 KOs) on 12 November. This was a European debut for Ortiz. Ortiz won by unanimous decision after 12 rounds of fighting a highly evasive and defensive Scott. Scott went down many times during the fight which were ruled as slips. Ortiz knocked Scott down in rounds 4, 5 and 9 as the judges scored the contest 120–105, 120–106, and 119–106, all in favor of Ortiz, who picked up the vacant WBA inter-continental title. At one point in the first round, the referee halted the fight just to tell Scott to fight as he had not thrown a single punch. Scott started getting into the fight after the half way mark with some counter punching, none of which really affected Ortiz. In a lackluster fight, Ortiz landed 146 of 472 punches thrown (31 percent), while Scott landed 45 of 155 (29 percent).

After Ortiz defeated Scott, heavyweights opened up about fighting Ortiz next. British boxer David Allen (9–1, 6 KOs) was one to make his voice heard and approached Eddie Hearn about a possible fight. On 23 November, the fight was officially agreed to take place on the undercard of the Anthony Joshua vs. Éric Molina IBF heavyweight title fight on 10 December at the Manchester Arena, Manchester, England. Allen commented on the match-up, "I don’t think he's what he's hyped up to be, but I will give him more opportunity than Malik Scott to show he is the real deal, I’ll stand in front of him and see what he's about. I’ll stand and trade because I can’t do anything else. You can expect a fight, that's for definite." Ortiz scored a seventh-round knockout victory over Allen. The end came when Allen was taking punishment against the ropes. Ortiz was landing left hooks and uppercuts, trying to take Allen out with one punch before the referee stopped the fight.

Following the win against Allen, Ortiz was named mandatory challenger for the winner of the WBA (Super), IBF and IBO unification bout between Anthony Joshua and Wladimir Klitschko.

=== Premier Boxing Champions ===
On 29 March 2017, Ortiz signed a deal with American boxing adviser Al Haymon. His first bout was believed to take place on 22 April 2017.

A day later it was revealed that he would be part of the 22 April undercard of the Shawn Porter vs Andre Berto world title eliminator at the Barclays Center, New York, against 36 year old journeyman Derric Rossy (31–12, 15 KOs) in a scheduled 10 round bout. Prior to this bout, Rossy had only won two of his last six fights but was well known for giving opponents a tough fight. Ortiz injured his right thumb during training. After receiving reports back from the doctor, on 14 April the fight was called off.

On 18 July 2017, it was reported that a deal was being worked out for Deontay Wilder (38–0, 37 KOs) to make his sixth defence of his WBC title against Ortiz. Wilder's promoter, Lou DiBella, had put the Barclays Center in Brooklyn on hold for 14 October and 4 November 2017. According to sources, Don King, promoter of Bermane Stiverne, mandatory challenger for Wilder, had reported to be working out a step aside fee from Wilder and Ortiz's advisor Al Haymon. Stiverne announced he had hired James Prince and attorney Josh Dubin as his managers, who were best known to have worked for Andre Ward, Shakur Stevenson and Bryant Jennings. Stiverne told Boxing Scene that Don King had not been given any permission to negotiate a step aside fee and he would work with his management team to ensure he challenges for the WBC title in his next fight. WBC president Mauricio Sulaiman worked on a deal to finalise Wilder vs. Ortiz for 4 November 2017. According to TheRing.tv, Stiverne agreed a mid six-figure payday to allow the fight to take place. In a phone interview, Stiverne mentioned the step-a-side fee and reported he could fight former world title challenger Dominic Breazeale next.

On 12 September it was reported by Showtime that the fight was a done deal, awaiting official announcement for the fight to take place on 4 November at Barclays Center in Brooklyn. Showtime revealed the card would include Daniel Jacobs as chief support. On 18 September the fight was made official, pending the official press conference, which would take place the next day. ESPN was advised that Stiverne would fight Breazeale on the undercard in a title eliminator.

==== Doping case ====
It was reported on 29 September 2017, Ortiz had failed a drug test carried out by VADA, part of the WBC clean fighters programme. The drugs found in Ortiz's sample were diuretics chlorothiazide and hydrochlorothiazide, which are used to treat high blood pressure but can also be used as masking agents for performance-enhancing drugs. The urine sample was taken on 22 September in Miami. Ortiz never informed VADA that he had been on medication.

On 4 October, the WBC withdrew its sanction on the Wilder vs. Ortiz fight and immediately ordered Wilder to fight mandatory challenger Bermane Stiverne (25–2–1, 21 KOs). Ortiz's manager Jay Jimenez clarified the situation regarding the WBC, stating that their decision wasn't to punish Ortiz, but rather they were concerned about his health. He said, "The WBC will schedule a visit with one of their approved physicians to check Luis' health, and make sure he is 100% healthy and fit to fight, and that the blood pressure pills will not affect him physically."

On 9 October, Eddie Hearn, promoter of Anthony Joshua, stated that Ortiz could remain mandatory challenger for the WBA. Ortiz had until 20 October to request a 'B' sample. The WBA waited on this date before they would decide to take any action. On 20 October, the WBA suspended Ortiz. Ortiz and his handlers were notified that he would serve at least a six-month suspension, his mandatory status removed and would be removed from the rankings effective immediately.

On 2 November the WBA officially handed Ortiz a one-year suspension, immediately removing him from their rankings and making him ineligible to fight for any WBA title for that period. Mendoza stated that Ortiz never asked for a 'B' sample to be tested accordingly, instead doing so verbally. WBA president Gilberto Mendoza later stated that the longevity of the ban was also due to Ortiz being a repeat offender, having previously failed a test in 2014 for anabolic steroids. A final ruling was set by the WBC on 30 November where Ortiz was fined US$25,000, however was given a pass, meaning he would remain in the rankings.

==== Ring return ====
Ortiz wasted no time returning to the ring. On 4 December 2017, it was announced that he would appear on a special Friday night edition of Premier Boxing Champions on 8 December at the Hialeah Park in Miami, Florida, his first fight in Florida in three years, against journeyman Daniel Martz (16–5–1, 13 KOs) in a scheduled 10-round bout. The fight was a late addition due to Chad Dawson-Edwin Rodriguez being cancelled after the former suffered an injury in training. Ortiz made quick work of Martz, knocking him down in the first round with a body shot before getting the knockout victory in round 2, sending Martz face-first to the canvas from a left hook to the head. After the fight, Ortiz called out Wilder, who was sat near ringside, calling commentary. Wilder said to Ortiz, ”I guarantee you, you'll have the fight.”

==== Ortiz vs. Wilder ====
On 19 December, negotiations resumed between Ortiz and Wilder, with a potential fight for Wilder's WBC heavyweight title to take place at the Barclays Center in Brooklyn on 3 March 2018. According to RingTV on 30 December, an agreement had been reached. Terms were agreed on 12 January and the fight was officially announced on 23 January. Wilder weighed his lowest since turning professional in 2008, at 214 pounds. Ortiz came in at 241¼ pounds.

Wilder overcame difficulty and knocked Ortiz out in round 10 to retain his WBC title in front of a crowd of 14,069. Both boxers started the fight cautious with Wilder throwing the jab, however Ortiz seemed to do more in the opening 4 rounds, counter punching and throwing combinations. Wilder took control in round five, knocking Ortiz down once. Wilder was hurt badly in round 7 by a right hook and left hand from Ortiz. Wilder was then trapped against the ropes, taking head and body shots from Ortiz. Referee David Fields kept a close eye on Wilder, who at one point, looked to be almost out on his feet, but managed to make it to the end of the round. Despite Ortiz not managing to drop Wilder in round 7, all three judges scored the round 10–8 for Ortiz. Wilder used rounds 8 and 9 to recuperate and managed to avoid any further punishment. Wilder hurt Ortiz with a right hand at the end of round 9. Wilder then unloaded on Ortiz in round 10, who at that point looked tired, dropping him twice before the match was halted by referee David Fields. The official time of the stoppage was at 2:05 of round 10.

At the time of stoppage, all three judges had their scorecards 85–84 in favor of Wilder. After the fight, Wilder spoke about his win and praised Ortiz, "'King Kong' ain't got nothing on me. A true champion always finds a way to come back, and that's what I did tonight. Luis Ortiz is definitely a crafty guy. He put up a great fight. We knew we had to wear him down. I showed everyone I can take a punch. When Ortiz leaves tonight, he can hold his head high. He gave the fans a hell of a fight." Ortiz also gave his thoughts on the fight. Speaking through a translator, he said, "I feel fine. I did receive a right hand, but I'm OK. I was listening to the directions that my corner was giving me. In this sport, any punch can end a fight. It was a great fight and I performed well." According to CompuBox Stats, Wilder landed 98 of 346 punches thrown (28%) and Ortiz landed 87 of his 363 thrown (24%). For the fight, Wilder earned a career-high payday of $2.1 million and Ortiz received a $500,000 purse. The event was the Barclays Center's second-biggest boxing crowd after Thurman vs. García, which was attended by 16,533 in March 2017. The fight averaged 1.1 million viewers and peaked at 1.2 million on Showtime. The last time Showtime did over 1 million viewers was in 2015 when Wilder defeated Stiverne for the WBC title.

==== Ortiz vs. Cojanu ====
On 7 July 2018, it was rumored that Ortiz would return in a 10-round bout on 28 July, on the undercard of the WBC and IBF lightweight unification fight between Mikey Garcia and Robert Easter Jr., against Joe Hanks (22–2, 14 KOs) at the Staples Center in Los Angeles, California. Three days later, it was officially announced that Ortiz would fight on that card, however would instead fight former world title challenger Răzvan Cojanu (16–3, 9 KOs). Ortiz won the fight via knockout in round 2. Ortiz used the first round landing clean right hooks and left hands to Cojanu's head. After being taunted a number of times in the beginning of round 2, Ortiz caught Cojanu with a right followed by a left hook to the head which sent him down face first. Cojanu was able to beat the count but looked badly hurt. The referee stopped the action at 2 minutes and 8 seconds. After the fight, speaking through a translator, Ortiz said, "I want to fight [unified titleholder Anthony] Joshua, but he only fights boxers he's sure he can defeat. I'm going to ask the government to put me on disability, maybe that way Joshua will fight me [...] I won't shy away from any challenge. I'm ready." The WBC stated they would not force the Wilder vs. Dominic Breazeale mandatory fight until the end of 2018, so a rematch between Wilder and Ortiz would be acceptable before then. The fight averaged 583,000 viewers and peaked at 606,000 viewers.

==== Ortiz vs. Kauffman ====
On 24 October 2018, Ortiz's manager Jay Jimenez announced that a deal had been reached for Ortiz to fight American boxer Travis Kauffman (32–2) on the Deontay Wilder vs. Tyson Fury Showtime PPV card on 1 December at the Staples Center in Los Angeles, California. The fight, along with the rest of the card was finalized on 9 November. Before the fight was announced, Ortiz and Dillian Whyte called each other out. Ortiz offered Whyte a fight on the 1 December card and Whyte offered Ortiz a chance to fight him on 22 December in London. Ortiz accepted Whyte's offer, however promoter Eddie Hearn stated Dillian Whyte vs. Derek Chisora made more sense in the UK. In the build up to his fight against Ortiz, Kauffman questioned Ortiz's wins on his resume after multiple failed drug tests. At the same time, he also praised Ortiz's boxing skills. Ortiz stepped on the scales at 241 pounds and Kauffman weighed 229 pounds. For the fight, Ortiz was guaranteed $375,000 compared to Kauffman's $125,000 purse. On fight night, Ortiz dropped Kauffman three times before winning the fight via TKO in the final round. The official time of stoppage was 1 minute and 58 seconds of round 10. Ortiz dominated every round leading to the stoppage, however Kauffman was always standing in front of him and showed a good chin and heart, even switching to the southpaw stance, where he had some success. Ortiz was twice warned for low blows. In round 6, Ortiz landed an overhand left which dropped Kauffman to the canvas. Ortiz, believing he won, stood on the top ropes and did his signature chest pounding. Kauffman beat the count and finished the round. Another overhand left, this time to Kauffman's jaw, dropped him for a second time in the first minute of round 8. Kauffman slowly got up and again beat the count and saw out the remainder of the round. In the first minute of round 10, Ortiz landed another overhand left, dropping Kauffman a third time. After Kauffman beat the count, Ortiz piled on the pressure with numerous power shots, mostly unanswered, forcing referee Thomas Taylor to step in and stop the fight. Ortiz landed 135 punches in comparison to the 37 punches landed by Kauffman. Ortiz landed 69 power punches in total. After the fight, Ortiz stated he was looking for fight Wilder. British boxer Joe Joyce, who also boxed on the card, called out Ortiz. Ortiz later accepted, stating he does not turn down a challenge.

==== Ortiz vs. Hammer ====
On 16 January 2019, it was announced that Ortiz would next fight German heavyweight contender Christian Hammer (24–5, 14 KOs) 2 March at Barclays Center in Brooklyn, New York. Ortiz stated his goal was to still become a world champion and this bout would be to 'stay active' and 'clean out' the remainder of the division. The fight was made official the next day, to take place on the Erislandy Lara vs. Brian Castaño undercard, live on Showtime. The bout was scheduled for 10 rounds. The fight was Hammer's American debut as he weighed in at 257 pounds. Ortiz weighed 238.75 pounds, his lightest weight in nearly 3½ years. Hammer was ranked #12 by the WBO at the time. There was an announced crowd of 7,329 fans in attendance at the Barclays Center. Ortiz was taken the distance for only the third time in his professional career, easily outpointing Hammer over 10 rounds. The three judges scored the bout 100–90, 99–91, and 99–91 in Ortiz's favour. Ortiz controlled the bout from the opening bell, hurting Hammer with body shots in round 2. Both boxers had a bloodied nose by the midway point. Hammer managed to back Ortiz up with a right hand. With his jab, power and movement, Ortiz remained in control of the bout. Although Hammer landed some solid shots of his own, he failed to follow up with further punches.

==== Ortiz vs. Wilder II ====
In September 2019, it was announced that a rematch between Ortiz and WBC champion Deontay Wilder had been confirmed on 23 November 2019. On the weigh in Ortiz weighed in at 236 1/2 pounds, and Wilder weighed in at 219½ pounds. In the fight, Ortiz outboxed Wilder for most of the fight and was leading on all three judges' scorecards 58–56, 59–55, and 59–55, but was ultimately stopped by a straight right and knocked out in the 7th round.

==== Ortiz vs. Flores ====
On 7 November 2020, Ortiz fought Alexander Flores. Ortiz floored Flores 45 seconds into the fight with a body shot, from which Flores was not able to recover, ending the fight with a first-round KO.

==== Ortiz vs. Martin ====
On November 15, 2021, it was revealed by ESPN that Ortiz and one-time IBF heavyweight titleholder Charles Martin had come to an agreement to face each other on January 1, 2022, after both fighters had spent the entire 2021 without a single fight. The fight was officially announced two days later, as the main event of a FOX PPV. Ortiz entered the fight as the favorite, with most odds-makers having him as a -450 to -350 favorite. Ortiz justified his role as the betting favorite, as he won the fight by a sixth-round stoppage. He staggered Martin with an overhand left, before knocking him down with a flurry of punches. Although Martin was able to beat the ten count, he was quickly knocked down for the second time after the action resumed, which prompted the referee to wave the fight off. Martin had a good start to the fight, as he managed to knock Ortiz down twice early in the fight, in rounds one and four. Martin was leading on the scorecards at the time of the stoppage, with scores of 48–45, 48–45 and 47–46. Ortiz earned $1.5 million for the fight, with a $500,000 guaranteed purse and an additional $1 million from PPV shares.

==== Ortiz vs. Ruiz ====
Ortiz fought Andy Ruiz Jr. at Crypto.com Arena in Los Angeles, California, USA, on 4 September 2022, losing via unanimous decision after being knocked to the canvas three times during the contest.

== Professional boxing record ==
| 40 fights | 35 wins | 3 losses |
|---|---|---|
| By knockout | 30 | 2 |
| By decision | 3 | 1 |
| By disqualification | 2 | 0 |
| No contests | 2 | |

| No. | Result | Record | Opponent | Type | Round, time | Date | Location | Notes |
|---|---|---|---|---|---|---|---|---|
| 40 | Win | 35–3 (2) | Phillip Penson | KO | 1 (8), 1:53 | 19 Sep 2025 | Caribe Royale Orlando, Orlando, Florida, U.S. | |
| 39 | Win | 34–3 (2) | Francisco Cordero | KO | 1 (8), 1:46 | 13 Jan 2024 | Gimnasio Andres Gomez Hoyos, Cartagena, Colombia | |
| 38 | Loss | 33–3 (2) | Andy Ruiz Jr. | UD | 12 | 4 Sep 2022 | Crypto.com Arena, Los Angeles, California, U.S. | |
| 37 | Win | 33–2 (2) | Charles Martin | TKO | 6 (12), 1:37 | 1 Jan 2022 | Seminole Hard Rock Hotel and Casino, Hollywood, Florida, U.S. | |
| 36 | Win | 32–2 (2) | Alexander Flores | KO | 1 (10), 0:45 | 7 Nov 2020 | Microsoft Theater, Los Angeles, California, U.S. | |
| 35 | Loss | 31–2 (2) | Deontay Wilder | KO | 7 (12), 2:51 | 23 Nov 2019 | MGM Grand Garden Arena, Paradise, Nevada, U.S. | For WBC heavyweight title |
| 34 | Win | 31–1 (2) | Christian Hammer | UD | 10 | 2 Mar 2019 | Barclays Center, New York City, New York, U.S. | |
| 33 | Win | 30–1 (2) | Travis Kauffman | TKO | 10 (10), 1:58 | 1 Dec 2018 | Staples Center, Los Angeles, California, U.S. | |
| 32 | Win | 29–1 (2) | Răzvan Cojanu | TKO | 2 (10), 2:08 | 28 Jul 2018 | Staples Center, Los Angeles, California, U.S. | |
| 31 | Loss | 28–1 (2) | Deontay Wilder | TKO | 10 (12), 2:05 | 3 Mar 2018 | Barclays Center, New York City, New York, U.S. | For WBC heavyweight title |
| 30 | Win | 28–0 (2) | Daniel Martz | KO | 2 (10), 0:43 | 8 Dec 2017 | Park Race Track, Hialeah, Florida, U.S. | |
| 29 | Win | 27–0 (2) | David Allen | TKO | 7 (8), 2:59 | 10 Dec 2016 | Manchester Arena, Manchester, England | |
| 28 | Win | 26–0 (2) | Malik Scott | UD | 12 | 12 Nov 2016 | Salle des Etoiles, Monte Carlo, Monaco | Won vacant WBA Inter-Continental heavyweight title |
| 27 | Win | 25–0 (2) | Tony Thompson | KO | 6 (12), 2:29 | 5 Mar 2016 | D.C. Armory, Washington, D.C., U.S. | |
| 26 | Win | 24–0 (2) | Bryant Jennings | TKO | 7 (12), 2:41 | 19 Dec 2015 | Turning Stone Resort Casino, Verona, New York, U.S. | Retained WBA interim heavyweight title |
| 25 | Win | 23–0 (2) | Matías Ariel Vidondo | KO | 3 (12), 0:17 | 17 Oct 2015 | Madison Square Garden, New York City, New York, U.S. | Won vacant WBA interim heavyweight title |
| 24 | Win | 22–0 (2) | Byron Polley | TKO | 1 (8), 2:38 | 20 Jun 2015 | Bell Centre, Montreal, Quebec, Canada | |
| 23 | NC | 21–0 (2) | Lateef Kayode | TKO | 1 (12), 2:55 | 11 Sep 2014 | The Joint, Paradise, Nevada, U.S. | Vacant WBA interim heavyweight title at stake; Originally a TKO win for Ortiz, later ruled an NC after he failed a drug test |
| 22 | Win | 21–0 (1) | Monte Barrett | KO | 4 (10), 0:38 | 3 Apr 2014 | Fantasy Springs Resort Casino, Indio, California, U.S. | |
| 21 | Win | 20–0 (1) | Álex Gonzales | KO | 1 (10), 2:00 | 26 Nov 2013 | BB&T Center, Sunrise, Florida, U.S. | |
| 20 | NC | 19–0 (1) | Joseph Rabotte | KO | 3 (10), 2:59 | 20 Jul 2013 | Mirage Exotic Nightlife, Greensboro, North Carolina, U.S. | Originally a KO win for Ortiz after Rabotte fell out of the ring, later ruled an NC |
| 19 | Win | 19–0 | Santiago de Paula | TKO | 4 (10), 2:22 | 16 Nov 2012 | Club de Leones El Millón, Santo Domingo, Dominican Republic | |
| 18 | Win | 18–0 | Juan Carlos Antonio Maldonado | TKO | 1 (6), 0:30 | 9 Nov 2012 | Gimnasio Joan Guzmán, Santo Domingo, Dominican Republic | |
| 17 | Win | 17–0 | José Santos Peralta | KO | 1 (10), 2:24 | 30 Sep 2012 | Gimnasio Joan Guzmán, Santo Domingo, Dominican Republic | |
| 16 | Win | 16–0 | Walter Palacios | TKO | 2 (6), 0:10 | 26 May 2012 | Polideportivo España, Managua, Nicaragua | |
| 15 | Win | 15–0 | Epifanio Mendoza | DQ | 7 (10), 1:07 | 10 Feb 2012 | Community Center, Palm Bay, Florida, U.S. | Won vacant WBC Latino and WBO Latino heavyweight titles; Mendoza disqualified for a low blow |
| 14 | Win | 14–0 | Frank Mola | RTD | 2 (10), 3:00 | 25 Nov 2011 | Coliseo Teo Cruz, Santo Domingo, Dominican Republic | |
| 13 | Win | 13–0 | Arron Lyons | RTD | 7 (10), 3:00 | 12 Aug 2011 | Hard Rock Live, Hollywood, Florida, U.S. | |
| 12 | Win | 12–0 | Henry Sáenz | TKO | 3 (11) | 30 Jul 2011 | Gimnasio Nacional, San José, Costa Rica | Retained WBA Fedelatin heavyweight title |
| 11 | Win | 11–0 | Luis Andrés Pineda | KO | 6 (9), 1:43 | 17 Jun 2011 | Roberto Durán Arena, Panama City, Panama | Retained WBC FECARBOX heavyweight title; Won vacant WBA Fedelatin heavyweight title |
| 10 | Win | 10–0 | Jason Barnett | KO | 1 (6), 2:38 | 3 Jun 2011 | A La Carte Event Pavilion, Tampa, Florida, U.S. | |
| 9 | Win | 9–0 | Corey Winfield | KO | 3 (8), 2:28 | 21 May 2011 | Recreation Center, Wilson, North Carolina, U.S. | |
| 8 | Win | 8–0 | Bert Cooper | TKO | 2 (10), 1:29 | 23 Apr 2011 | County Fair & Exposition, Miami, Florida, U.S. | |
| 7 | Win | 7–0 | Jerry Butler | TKO | 3 (6), 1:40 | 2 Apr 2011 | Roger Dean Stadium, Jupiter, Florida, U.S. | |
| 6 | Win | 6–0 | Rubén Rivera | DQ | 5 (8), 2:50 | 28 Jan 2011 | DoubleTree, Tampa, Florida, U.S. | Rivera disqualified for low blows |
| 5 | Win | 5–0 | Francisco Álvarez | TKO | 8 (8), 1:27 | 7 Dec 2010 | Hard Rock Live, Hollywood, Florida, U.S. | |
| 4 | Win | 4–0 | Zack Page | TKO | 8 (8), 0:42 | 19 Sep 2010 | Hard Rock Live, Hollywood, Florida, U.S. | |
| 3 | Win | 3–0 | Kendrick Releford | UD | 8 | 24 Aug 2010 | Hard Rock Live, Hollywood, Florida, U.S. | Won vacant WBC FECARBOX heavyweight title |
| 2 | Win | 2–0 | Charles Davis | TKO | 4 (6), 2:20 | 15 Jun 2010 | Hard Rock Live, Hollywood, Florida, U.S. | |
| 1 | Win | 1–0 | Lamar Davis | TKO | 1 (4), 1:18 | 16 Feb 2010 | Hard Rock Live, Hollywood, Florida, U.S. | |

Sporting positions
Regional boxing titles
| Vacant Title last held by Derric Rossy | WBC FECARBOX heavyweight champion August 24, 2010 – February 10, 2012; Won Latino title | Vacant Title next held by Billy Wright |
| Vacant Title last held by Bermane Stiverne | WBA Fedelatin heavyweight champion June 17, 2011 – April 2012; Vacated | Vacant Title next held by Raphael Zumbano Love |
| Vacant Title last held by Hassan Chitsaz | WBC Latino heavyweight champion February 10, 2012 – April 2012; Vacated | Vacant Title next held by Billy Wright |
| Vacant Title last held by Gonzalo Basile | WBO Latino heavyweight champion February 10, 2012 – June 2013; Vacated | Vacant Title next held by Irineu Beato Costa Junior |
| Vacant Title last held by Lucas Browne | WBA Inter-Continental heavyweight champion November 12, 2016 – December 2016; Vacated | Vacant Title next held by Kubrat Pulev |
World boxing titles
| Vacant Title last held by John Ruiz | WBA heavyweight champion Interim title October 17, 2015 – November 1, 2016; Stripped | Vacant Title next held by Trevor Bryan |
Awards
| Previous: James DeGale vs. Badou Jack | PBC Fight of the Year vs. Deontay Wilder; 2018 | Incumbent |
