= Charles Martin (boxer) =

American boxer (born 1986)

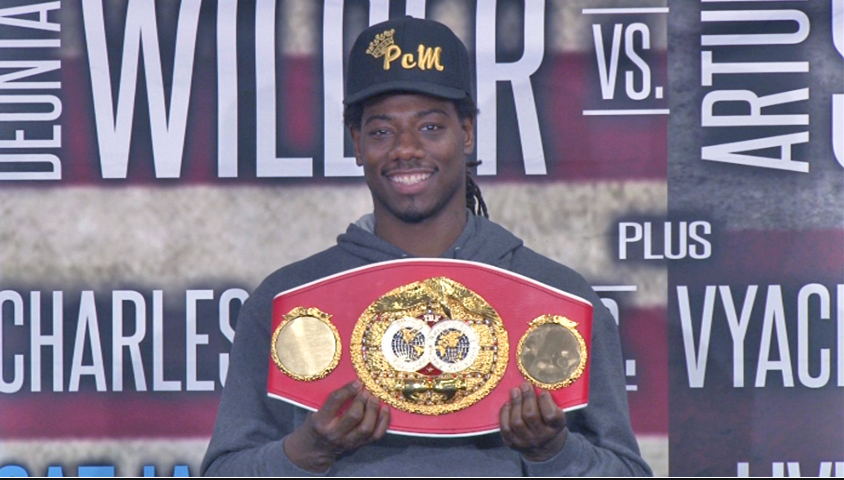

Personal information
- Nickname: Prince Charles
- Born: Charles Lee Martin; April 24, 1986 (age 40) St. Louis, Missouri, U.S.
- Height: 6 ft 5 in (196 cm)
- Weight: Heavyweight

Boxing career
- Reach: 80 in (203 cm)
- Stance: Southpaw

Boxing record
- Total fights: 36
- Wins: 30
- Win by KO: 27
- Losses: 5
- Draws: 1
Medal record
Men's amateur boxing
Representing United States
Golden Gloves
Silver medal – second place	2012 Mesquite	Super-heavyweight
US National PAL Championships
Bronze medal – third place	2011 Toledo	Super-heavyweight
Gold medal – first place	2012 Toledo	Super-heavyweight

Charles Lee Martin (born April 24, 1986) is an American professional boxer. He held the IBF heavyweight world title in 2016. His 85-day reign as champion is the second-shortest in heavyweight boxing history, after Tony Tucker's 64 days in 1987 (also as IBF champion).

== Amateur career ==
Martin had 64 fights as an amateur, having started boxing at the age of 22. In 2012 he won the National PAL Championships.

== Professional career ==
=== Early career ===
Martin turned professional on October 27, 2012. He made his TV debut on ESPN July 19, 2013, when he beat Aaron Kinch by a fourth-round TKO. On September 21, he beat then-undefeated Vincent Thompson (13–0). The fight was in Thompson's home state Washington and Martin got a unanimous decision. He dropped Thompson in the first round, for the first time in his career. On October 25, Martin defeated Haitian Dieuly Aristilde, by TKO in round one. On November 14, Martin became the first man to ever stop Joey Dawejko. Martin dropped Dawejko in the 4th round. Dawejko's corner asked to get the fight stopped between the 4th and 5th rounds. Charles Martin fought 11 times in 2013. On December 21 he won against undefeated Cuban heavyweight Glendy Hernandez (10–0).

=== Rise up the ranks ===
On April 16, 2014 Martin won the vacant WBO–NABO heavyweight title by beating former undefeated boxer Alexander Flores by KO in the 4th round. Martin was in a non-title fight a month later against 38-year-old journeyman Rafael Pedro at the Santa Monica Pier in Santa Monica, California. In an overmatched fight, Martin floored Pedro twice in round one winning the bout via knockout. In July 2014, Martin successfully defended the title for the first time at BB King Blues Club & Grill in New York against 37-year-old veteran Kertson Manswell. Manswell hadn't fought in seven months, since his loss to Wendell Jorkhu. Martin entered the bout with a seven-fight knockout streak. Martin won via the third knockdown rule, knocking Manswell down three times in round 3, forcing the stoppage.

After a six-month gap, Martin returned to fight Damon McCreary (15–3, 11 KOs) in a non-title six-round bout. Martin won after 2 minutes into the first round via TKO. Martin made a defence of the title on February 28, 2015 against former Brazilian heavyweight champion Raphael Zumbano Love (35–9–1, 28 KOs) at the Celebrity Theater in Phoenix, Arizona. Martin won via TKO in the 10th and final round with a minute remaining.

Martin's next defence came on April 25, on the undercard of Klitschko-Jennings at the Madison Square Garden in Manhattan, New York against British boxer Tom Dallas. The fight lasted one round as Dallas was knocked out by a straight left hand to the head from Martin. Martin made his fourth and final defence of his WBO–NABO title on September 25 at the Legacy Arena in Birmingham, Alabama against Mexican WBO latino heavyweight champion Vicente Sandez (15–4, 10 KOs) in a scheduled 10-round fight. By the third round, Martin was ahead on all three judges' scorecards 20–17, knocking Sandez down in round 2. The fight was stopped by referee Flynn Gerald, 35 seconds into round 3 following another knockdown.

=== IBF heavyweight champion ===
==== Martin vs. Glazkov ====
Following Tyson Fury's win against Wladimir Klitschko in November 2015 in becoming the new unified heavyweight champion, the IBF ordered Fury to make a mandatory defence against Vyacheslav Glazkov. However, Fury opted to take the rematch against Klitschko, thus being stripped of the IBF title in the process. The IBF then ordered Glazkov to fight Martin for a vacant world title on January 16 at Barclays Center in Brooklyn, New York. Glaskov's purse for the fight was $804,700, whilst Martin had a purse of $433,300.

Martin claimed the vacant title by stopping Glazkov in the third round, due to injury. By round 3, the scorecards were (19–19, 20–18 Glazkov, and 20–18 Martin). Glazkov slipped to the canvas when he fell backwards after trying to dodge a right hook from Martin. Referee Earl Brown ruled it a slip, but Glazkov appeared to hurt his right knee following the fall. When the fight resumed, Glazkov threw a right body hook but was hit by Martins left jab and went down again after losing his balance. He dropped to the canvas clearly in pain. The fight was stopped, with the ringside doctor diagnosing him with a torn right ACL. According to CompuBox, Martin landed 26 of 105 punches (25 percent), and Glazkov connected on 19 of 64 blows (30 percent).

After winning the IBF world title, Martin narrowed down a shortlist of boxers he could make his first defence against. The three names were former world title challengers Chris Arreola, Artur Szpilka and rising contender Dominic Breazeale.

==== Martin vs. Joshua ====
Martin chose to make the first defence of his title against rising British star and 2012 Olympic gold medalist Anthony Joshua at The O2 Arena in London on 9 April 2016. It was reported that Martin would bank £6 million ($8.5 m) for the defense against Joshua.

Joshua set the pace in the first round and kept the southpaw Martin at bay before sending him to the canvas with a straight right hand in the second round. Martin got to his feet only to be knocked down for a second time by a similar punch just moments later. This time Martin failed to beat the count after taking too long to get up, and the referee counted Martin out, with Joshua winning his first world title. Martin was heavily criticized for his performance, and apparent lack of ambition to win the fight. Observers accused him of quitting early, feeling that he could have got up quicker and fought on. Martin later placed the blame on the pre-fight distractions, claiming that he was 'mentally not there'. At just 85 days, Martin's reign as IBF heavyweight champion was the second-shortest in professional boxing history, with only Tony Tucker's 1987 reign being shorter.

=== Post-title career ===
On April 17, 2017 Martin announced that he would make a return on April 25 in a non-televised fight against 37-year-old journeyman Byron Polley (30–20–1, 13 KOs, 3 NC) at the Fitzgeralds Casino & Hotel in Tunica, Mississippi in a scheduled 10-round bout. Martin won the fight via second-round TKO. In the post fight, he said, “I’m just back to finish what I started ... Now I’m back and I’m ready to be undisputed, like my plans were originally, undisputed champ.” Polley was dropped two times in the second before the fight was stopped 51 seconds into the round.

Martin continued his comeback trail on July 18 at the Rapides Coliseum in Alexandria, Louisiana against 31-year-old journeyman Michael Marrone (21–7, 15 KOs). Martin won the bout in the first round via knockout. A first knockdown occurred after Martin landed a left hook, then a left shot to the body floored Marrone again. Marrone was then counted out by referee Kenny Saintes.

==== Martin vs. Kownacki ====
In July 2018, Showtime announced it was planning an event to take place on September 8, headlined by Danny García vs. Shawn Porter for the vacant WBC welterweight title. It was rumoured that Martin would challenge Polish rising contender Adam Kownacki (17–0, 14 KOs) on the undercard. On August 1, the card was confirmed to take place at the Barclays Center in New York City. Kownacki was coming into the bout with wins over Artur Szpilka and Iago Kiladze. Martin started the fight slow, being forced to box on the back foot, allowing Kownacki to take a lead on the scorecards. It was from round 3 when Martin began opening up and letting his hands go. The fight had lots of action throughout the 10 rounds. The final round was considered a potential round of the year by pundits and commentators, which saw both boxers trade to the head and body. All three judges scored the bout 96–94 in favor of Kownacki. Both boxers earned a $100,000 purse for the fight. After the fight, Martin said, "I believed I got the win. I did work on the inside and no one saw that. I did really good work on the inside. I will get back in the gym. Looks are very deceiving. I put up a hell of a fight and I came up just short." According to CompuBox stats, Martin landed 203 punches of 621 thrown (33%) and Kownacki landed 242 of his 729 landed (33%). The fight, which opened Showtime's telecast, averaged 395,000 viewers and peaked at 503,000 viewers.

==== Martin vs. Corbin ====
On 16 March 2019, Martin faced Gregory Corbin. Corbin was no match for Martin, as Martin dominated each round. In the fourth round, Corbin hit Martin under the belt, for which he was penalized by the referee. Corbin continued his antics in the fifth and sixth round, and by the eighth round the referee had seen enough and disqualified Corbin, awarding Martin with the victory.

==== Martin vs Martz ====
On July 13, 2019, Martin faced Daniel Martz. Martin dominated the fight, as he dropped Martz twice, once in the third and once in the fourth round, the latter proving to be the decisive one.

==== Martin vs Washington ====
On February 22, 2020, Martin, ranked #11 by the IBF faced fellow contender Gerald Washington, ranked #9 by the IBF on the Deontay Wilder vs. Tyson Fury II undercard. Martin landed a straight left on Washington in the sixth round, followed by another straight left which sent Washington to the canvas. Washington managed to beat the count, but referee Tony Weeks deemed Washington not fit to continue fighting, awarding Martin with the TKO victory.

==== Martin vs Ortiz ====
Martin fought Luis Ortiz at Seminole Hard Rock Hotel and Casino in Hollywood, Florida, on January 1, 2022, losing by technical knockout in the sixth round.

==== Martin vs Anderson ====
On July 1, 2023, Martin challenged WBC–USNBC and WBO International heavyweight champion Jared Anderson at the Huntington Center, in Toledo, Ohio, but lost by unanimous decision.

==== Martin vs Ajagba ====
Martin faced Efe Ajagba at Meta Apex in Enterprise, Nevada, on February 15, 2026. He lost by stoppage in the fourth round.

== Personal life ==
Martin was born in St. Louis, Missouri, before moving to Colorado Springs and Phoenix after the age of 12. Martin started doing construction work from the age of 14 and had his first son at a young age. He has four children.

In the early hours of August 5, 2016, it was reported by Sky Sports that Martin had been shot in Los Angeles. He was allegedly involved in an altercation with two men that resulted in him having a gunshot wound to his forearm as he was driving away. He underwent surgery for the wound. Martin checked out of hospital following surgery on August 10.

== Professional boxing record ==
36 fights	30 wins	5 losses
By knockout	27	3
By decision	2	2
By disqualification	1	0
Draws	1	

No.	Result	Record	Opponent	Type	Round, time	Date	Location	Notes
36	Loss	30–5–1	Efe Ajagba	TKO	4 (10), 1:11	15 Feb 2026	Meta Apex, Enterprise, Nevada, U.S.	
35	Win	30–4–1	Matthew McKinney	KO	1 (8), 2:59	Nov 16, 2024	Fox Theater, Redwood City, California, U.S.	
34	Loss	29–4–1	Jared Anderson	UD	10	Jul 1, 2023	Huntington Center, Toledo, U.S.	For WBC–USNBC and WBO International heavyweight titles
33	Win	29–3–1	Devin Vargas	KO	4 (8), 1:59	Sep 4, 2022	Crypto.com Arena, Los Angeles, U.S.	
32	Loss	28–3–1	Luis Ortiz	TKO	6 (12), 1:36	Jan 1, 2022	Seminole Hard Rock Hotel and Casino, Hollywood, Florida, U.S.	
31	Win	28–2–1	Gerald Washington	TKO	6 (12), 1:57	Feb 22, 2020	MGM Grand Garden Arena, Paradise, Nevada, U.S.	
30	Win	27–2–1	Daniel Martz	TKO	4 (10), 2:03	Jul 13, 2019	Minneapolis Armory, Minneapolis, Minnesota, U.S.	
29	Win	26–2–1	Gregory Corbin	DQ	8 (10), 0:53	Mar 16, 2019	AT&T Stadium, Arlington, Texas, U.S.	Corbin disqualified for repeated low blows
28	Loss	25–2–1	Adam Kownacki	UD	10	Sep 8, 2018	Barclays Center, New York City, New York, U.S.	
27	Win	25–1–1	Mike Marrone	TKO	1 (10), 2:31	Jul 18, 2017	Rapides Coliseum, Alexandria, Louisiana, U.S.	
26	Win	24–1–1	Byron Polley	TKO	2 (10), 0:51	Apr 25, 2017	Fitzgeralds Casino and Hotel, Tunica Resorts, Mississippi, U.S.	
25	Loss	23–1–1	Anthony Joshua	KO	2 (12), 1:32	Apr 9, 2016	The O2 Arena, London, England	Lost IBF heavyweight title
24	Win	23–0–1	Vyacheslav Glazkov	TKO	3 (12), 1:50	Jan 16, 2016	Barclays Center, New York City, New York, U.S.	Won vacant IBF heavyweight title
23	Win	22–0–1	Vicente Sandez	KO	3 (10), 0:35	Sep 26, 2015	Legacy Arena, Birmingham, Alabama, U.S.	Retained WBO–NABO heavyweight title
22	Win	21–0–1	Tom Dallas	TKO	1 (10), 2:56	Apr 25, 2015	Madison Square Garden, Manhattan, New York, U.S.	Retained WBO–NABO heavyweight title
21	Win	20–0–1	Raphael Zumbano Love	KO	10 (10), 1:47	Feb 28, 2015	Celebrity Theatre, Phoenix, Arizona, U.S.	Retained WBO–NABO heavyweight title
20	Win	19–0–1	Damon McCreary	KO	1 (6), 2:21	Jan 9, 2015	Morongo Casino Resort & Spa, Cabazon, California, U.S.	
19	Win	18–0–1	Kertson Manswell	TKO	3 (10), 2:33	Jul 23, 2014	BB King Blues Club & Grill, New York City, New York, U.S.	Retained WBO–NABO heavyweight title
18	Win	17–0–1	Rafael Pedro	KO	1 (10), 2:19	May 20, 2014	Pier, Santa Monica, California, U.S.	Retained WBO–NABO heavyweight title
17	Win	16–0–1	Alexander Flores	KO	4 (10), 1:14	Apr 16, 2014	Barker Hangar, Santa Monica, California, U.S.	Won vacant WBO–NABO heavyweight title
16	Win	15–0–1	Tyyab Beale	KO	2 (8), 2:37	Mar 1, 2014	Evangeline Downs, Opelousas, Louisiana, U.S.	
15	Win	14–0–1	Maurenzo Smith	RTD	3 (8), 3:00	Feb 6, 2014	Florentine Gardens, Los Angeles, California, U.S.	
14	Win	13–0–1	Glendy Hernandez	RTD	4 (6), 3:00	Dec 21, 2013	Westin Bonaventure Hotel, Los Angeles, California, U.S.	
13	Win	12–0–1	Joey Dawejko	RTD	4 (6), 3:00	Nov 14, 2013	Florentine Gardens, Los Angeles, California, U.S.	
12	Win	11–0–1	Dieuly Aristilde	TKO	1 (6), 2:27	Oct 25, 2013	Quiet Cannon, Montebello, California, U.S.	
11	Win	10–0–1	Vincent Thompson	UD	6	Sep 21, 2013	Little Creek Casino Resort, Shelton, Washington, U.S.	
10	Win	9–0–1	Aaron Kinch	TKO	4 (6), 2:55	Jul 19, 2013	Rockingham Park, Salem, New Hampshire, U.S.	
9	Win	8–0–1	Joshua Clark	UD	6	Jun 6, 2013	The Hangar, Costa Mesa, California, U.S.	
8	Win	7–0–1	Sylvester Barron	KO	2 (6), 0:31	May 22, 2013	Pier, Santa Monica, California, U.S.	
7	Draw	6–0–1	Alvaro Morales	MD	4	Mar 30, 2013	Westin Bonaventure Hotel, Los Angeles, California, U.S.	
6	Win	6–0	Phillip Triantafillo	KO	2 (4), 1:44	Mar 14, 2013	Florentine Gardens, Los Angeles, California, U.S.	
5	Win	5–0	Anthony Hinson	KO	1 (4), 2:57	Feb 23, 2013	Quiet Cannon, Montebello, California, U.S.	
4	Win	4–0	Kosetatino Sinoti	KO	1 (4), 2:39	Feb 1, 2013	Jonathan Club, Los Angeles, California, U.S.	
3	Win	3–0	Terrance Perro	KO	4 (4), 0:41	Dec 21, 2012	Florentine Gardens, Los Angeles, California, U.S.	
2	Win	2–0	Larry Ward	KO	3 (4), 1:31	Nov 17, 2012	Westin Bonaventure Hotel, Los Angeles, California, U.S.	
1	Win	1–0	Vashawn Tomlin	KO	1 (4), 3:00	Oct 27, 2012	Music Factory, Charlotte, North Carolina, U.S.	

Sporting positions
Regional boxing titles
Vacant Title last held by Seth Mitchell	WBO–NABO heavyweight champion April 16, 2014 – January 2016; Vacated	Vacant Title next held by Jarrell Miller
World boxing titles
Vacant Title last held by Tyson Fury	IBF heavyweight champion January 16, 2016 – April 9, 2016	Succeeded by Anthony Joshua
