= Bryant Jennings =

American boxer

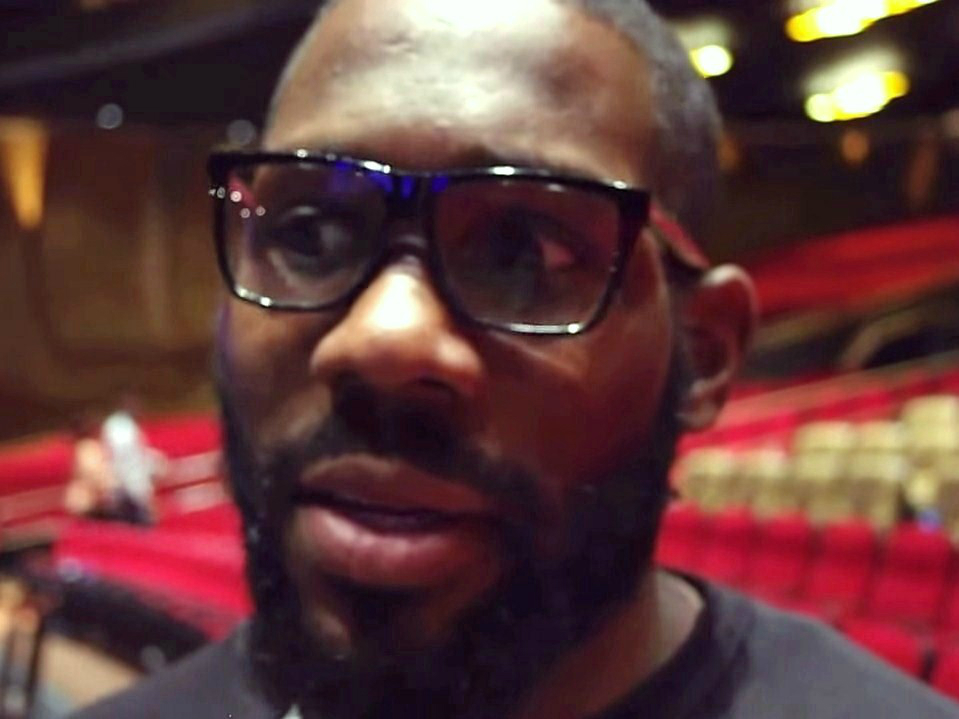
- Jennings in 2013

Personal information
- Nickname: By-By
- Born: September 25, 1984 (age 42) Philadelphia, Pennsylvania, U.S.
- Height: 6 ft 3 in (191 cm)
- Weight: Heavyweight

Boxing career
- Reach: 84 in (213 cm)
- Stance: Orthodox

Boxing record
- Total fights: 31
- Wins: 27
- Win by KO: 15
- Losses: 4

Bryant Jennings (born September 25, 1984) is an American professional boxer. He challenged once for the unified world heavyweight championship in 2015, and the WBA interim heavyweight title in the same year. He holds a notable win over former world heavyweight champion Siarhei Liakhovich.

== Amateur career ==
Jennings had an amateur record of 13–4 including a win over future UFC heavyweight champion Stipe Miocic. He reached the finals of the 2009 National Golden Gloves tournament, losing by decision to veteran Lenroy Thompson.

== Professional career ==
=== Early career ===
Jennings made his professional debut on February 26, 2010. He beat Zeferino Albino by unanimous decision over four rounds. He went on the knock out Jon Bolden in three rounds and then rematched Albino on April 30, this time he knocked Albino in the first round. He went on to beat Bernell Stewart and Randy Smith in 2010.

Jennings first fight of 2011 was on the February 26. He beat Theron Johnson by unanimous decision. He next fought David Williams, who he knocked out in two rounds. On 4 June he beat Mike Miller by unanimous decision. On July 23 he rematched Theron Johnson, again beating him by unanimous decision. Jennings fought twice more in 2011, beating Alexis Mejias and Kevin Franklin.

Jennings's first fight of 2012 was a ten-round bout against Maurice Byarm on January 21 at the Asylum Arena in South Philadelphia on the NBC Sports Network Fight Night opening card. Jennings won the bout by unanimous decision to claim the Pennsylvania State heavyweight title.

On March 24, 2012, he faced former WBO heavyweight champion Siarhei Liakhovich. The fight took place at Aviator Sports Complex, Brooklyn, New York and was televised on NBC Sports. Jennings controlled the fight with his jab and power punches. He won the fight after Liakhovich retired at the end of round nine. Jennings then faced Steve Collins (25–1) on June 16, 2012, at the Prudential Center, Newark, New Jersey. The fight was co-main event as part of NBC Sports Fight Night event, including Tomasz Adamek vs. Eddie Chambers. He won by unanimous decision after ten rounds to claim the USBA heavyweight title. Jennings went on to fight two more times in 2012, knocking out Chris Koval in 35 seconds. Then stopping Bowie Tupou in five rounds to retain his USBA heavyweight title.

Jennings fought once in 2013, on June 14, stopping Andrey Fedosov in six rounds after Fedosov did not come out for the seventh.

On January 25, 2014, Jennings fought Polish heavyweight, Artur Szpilka, at the Madison Square Garden. Jennings knocked out Szpilka in the tenth round. Jennings's next fight was against highly ranked contender Mike Perez, on July 26, 2014. He beat Perez by a close fought split decision to earn a title shot as No.1 ranked contender and mandatory challenger, for the WBC title.

Jennings later signed with promoters Gary Shaw and Antonio Leonard after buying out his existing agreement with Russell Peltz.

=== World title challenge ===
==== Jennings vs. Klitschko ====
Jennings faced heavyweight champion Wladimir Klitschko on April 25, 2015, in Madison Square Garden for the WBA (Super), IBF, WBO, IBO, The Ring, and lineal heavyweight titles. Klitschko won the fight due to his effective use of his jab and hard right cross keeping Jennings at bay, Klitschko won via unanimous decision with two judges scoring it 116–111 and the final judge scoring it 118–109.

==== Jennings vs. Ortiz ====
On December 19, 2015, Jennings faced undefeated Cuban heavyweight contender Luis Ortiz, for the WBA interim heavyweight title. Jennings lost the fight by technical knockout in the seventh round after he was dropped by a left uppercut from Ortiz, who then continued to land heavy shots before the referee stepped in to stop the fight.

=== Comeback ===
After not fighting for over a year following the Ortiz loss, Jennings signed with Top Rank. Jennings returned to the ring on August 19, 2017, against journeyman Daniel Martz on the undercard of Terence Crawford vs. Julius Indongo. He knocked out Martz in the second round. He next fought on December 9, 2017, at the Madison Square Garden, on the undercard of Vasiliy Lomachenko vs. Guillermo Rigondeaux. Where he knocked out Don Haynesworth in three rounds. His first fight of 2018 was against Akhror Muralimov on February 16. He knocked out Muralimov in the third round. Jennings's next fight took place on April 28, 2018, where he beat Joey Dawejko by unanimous decision over ten rounds.

==== Jennings vs. Dimitrenko ====
On June 27, 2018, it was announced that Jennings would take on German heavyweight contender Alexander Dimitrenko in a twelve-round main event on August 18, 2018, at the Ocean Resort Casino, Atlantic City, New Jersey. He won by technical knockout in the ninth round. This was a highly criticized stoppage with Dimitrenko even saying he was "still able to fight" and that "we are not children"

==== Jennings vs. Rivas ====
In his next fight, Jennings faced Oscar Rivas, ranked #10 at heavyweight by the IBF. Jennings outboxed Rivas thourghout most of the fight, however, Rivas, knowing only a knockout could bring him the win, came out swinging in the last round and managed to TKO Jennings after dropping him twice in a row.

==== Jennings vs. Joyce ====
In his following fight, Jennings faced Joe Joyce, who was ranked #14 by the WBC at the time. Jennings was the better man in the first round, but after that Joyce took control and dominated through most of the fight. Joyce won the fight on all three judges' scorecards, 118–109, 117–110 and 115–112.

== Personal life ==
Jennings is Muslim, and has been a vegan since August 2013.

== Professional boxing record ==
| 31 fights | 27 wins | 4 losses |
|---|---|---|
| By knockout | 15 | 2 |
| By decision | 12 | 2 |

| No. | Result | Record | Opponent | Type | Round, time | Date | Location | Notes |
|---|---|---|---|---|---|---|---|---|
| 31 | Win | 27–4 | Robert Simms | UD | 8 | Jun 14, 2026 | GLC Live At 20 Monroe, Grand Rapids, Michigan, U.S. | |
| 30 | Win | 26–4 | Devonte Williams | TKO | 1 (6), 2:26 | May 22, 2026 | The Mirage, Clinton Township, Michigan, U.S. | |
| 29 | Win | 25–4 | Joel Caudle | UD | 8 | Aug 24, 2024 | The Met Philadelphia, Philadelphia, Pennsylvania, U.S. | |
| 28 | Loss | 24–4 | Joe Joyce | UD | 12 | Jul 13, 2019 | The O2 Arena, London, England | |
| 27 | Loss | 24–3 | Óscar Rivas | TKO | 12 (12), 0:54 | Jan 18, 2019 | Turning Stone Resort & Casino, Verona, New York, U.S. | Lost IBF International and WBO–NABO heavyweight titles; For NABF heavyweight title |
| 26 | Win | 24–2 | Alexander Dimitrenko | TKO | 9 (12), 1:56 | Aug 18, 2018 | Ocean Resort Casino, Atlantic City, New Jersey, U.S. | Won IBF International and vacant WBO–NABO heavyweight titles |
| 25 | Win | 23–2 | Joey Dawejko | UD | 10 | Apr 28, 2018 | Liacouras Center, Philadelphia, Pennsylvania, U.S. | Won vacant Pennsylvania heavyweight title |
| 24 | Win | 22–2 | Akhror Muralimov | TKO | 3 (8), 1:12 | Feb 16, 2018 | Grand Sierra Resort Grand Theatre, Reno, Nevada, U.S. | |
| 23 | Win | 21–2 | Don Haynesworth | TKO | 3 (8), 2:29 | Dec 9, 2017 | The Theater at Madison Square Garden, New York City, New York, U.S. | |
| 22 | Win | 20–2 | Daniel Martz | TKO | 2 (8), 2:18 | Aug 19, 2017 | Pinnacle Bank Arena, Lincoln, Nebraska, U.S. | |
| 21 | Loss | 19–2 | Luis Ortiz | TKO | 7 (12), 2:41 | Dec 19, 2015 | Turning Stone Resort Casino, Verona, New York, U.S. | For WBA interim heavyweight title |
| 20 | Loss | 19–1 | Wladimir Klitschko | UD | 12 | Apr 25, 2015 | Madison Square Garden, New York City, New York, U.S. | For WBA (Super), IBF, WBO, IBO, and The Ring heavyweight titles |
| 19 | Win | 19–0 | Mike Perez | SD | 12 | Jul 26, 2014 | Madison Square Garden, New York City, New York, U.S. | |
| 18 | Win | 18–0 | Artur Szpilka | TKO | 10 (10), 2:20 | Jan 25, 2014 | The Theater at Madison Square Garden, New York City, New York, U.S. | |
| 17 | Win | 17–0 | Andrey Fedosov | RTD | 6 (10), 3:00 | Jun 14, 2013 | Sands Casino Resort, Bethlehem, Pennsylvania, U.S. | |
| 16 | Win | 16–0 | Bowie Tupou | TKO | 5 (12), 1:37 | Dec 8, 2012 | McGonigle Hall, Philadelphia, Pennsylvania, U.S. | Retained IBF–USBA heavyweight title |
| 15 | Win | 15–0 | Chris Koval | TKO | 1 (8), 0:35 | Sep 8, 2012 | Prudential Center, Newark, New Jersey, U.S. | |
| 14 | Win | 14–0 | Steve Collins | UD | 10 | Jun 16, 2012 | Prudential Center, Newark, New Jersey, U.S. | Won vacant IBF–USBA heavyweight title |
| 13 | Win | 13–0 | Siarhei Liakhovich | RTD | 9 (10), 3:00 | Mar 24, 2012 | Aviator Sports and Events Center, New York City, New York, U.S. | |
| 12 | Win | 12–0 | Maurice Byarm | UD | 10 | Jan 21, 2012 | Asylum Arena, Philadelphia, Pennsylvania, U.S. | Won vacant Pennsylvania heavyweight title |
| 11 | Win | 11–0 | Kevin Franklin | TKO | 1 (6), 1:51 | Nov 19, 2011 | Bally's, Atlantic City, New Jersey, U.S. | |
| 10 | Win | 10–0 | Alexis Mejias | UD | 6 | Sep 9, 2011 | Asylum Arena, Philadelphia, Pennsylvania, U.S. | |
| 9 | Win | 9–0 | Theron Johnson | UD | 6 | Jul 23, 2011 | Mandalay Bay Events Center, Paradise, Nevada, U.S. | |
| 8 | Win | 8–0 | Mike Miller | UD | 4 | Jun 4, 2011 | The Hamilton Manor, Hamilton Township, New Jersey, U.S. | |
| 7 | Win | 7–0 | David Williams | TKO | 2 (6), 3:00 | Apr 23, 2011 | Circus Maximus Showroom, Atlantic City, New Jersey, U.S. | |
| 6 | Win | 6–0 | Theron Johnson | UD | 6 | Feb 26, 2011 | Bally's, Atlantic City, New Jersey, U.S. | |
| 5 | Win | 5–0 | Randy Smith | TKO | 2 (4), 2:18 | Dec 9, 2010 | Prudential Center, Newark, New Jersey, U.S. | |
| 4 | Win | 4–0 | Bernell Stewart | UD | 4 | Jul 30, 2010 | South Philly Arena, Philadelphia, Pennsylvania, U.S. | |
| 3 | Win | 3–0 | Zeferino Albino | TKO | 1 (4), 2:59 | Apr 30, 2010 | South Philly Arena, Philadelphia, Pennsylvania, U.S. | |
| 2 | Win | 2–0 | Jon Bolden | KO | 3 (4), 3:06 | Apr 2, 2010 | The Blue Horizon, Philadelphia, Pennsylvania, U.S. | |
| 1 | Win | 1–0 | Zeferino Albino | UD | 4 | Feb 26, 2010 | South Philly Arena, Philadelphia, Pennsylvania, U.S. | |

Sporting positions
Regional boxing titles
| Vacant Title last held by Brian Minto | Pennsylvania heavyweight champion January 21, 2012 – May 2015; Vacated | Vacant Title next held by Amir Mansour |
| Vacant Title last held by Maurice Harris | USBA heavyweight champion June 16, 2012 – August 2013; Vacated | Vacant Title next held by Amir Mansour |
| Vacant Title last held by Amir Mansour | Pennsylvania heavyweight champion April 28, 2018 – present | Incumbent |
| Preceded by Alexander Dimitrenko | IBF International heavyweight champion August 18, 2018 – January 18, 2019 | Succeeded by Oscar Rivas |
| Vacant Title last held by Jean Pierre Augustin | WBO–NABO heavyweight champion August 18, 2018 – January 18, 2019 | Succeeded by Oscar Rivas |
