= Geovana Peres vs Lani Daniels II =

Boxing competition

History in the making
- Date: 30 March 2019
- Venue: SkyCity Convention Centre, Auckland, New Zealand
- Title on the line: WBO Light Heavyweight Championship

Tale of the tape
Boxer	(New Zealand) (Brazil) Geovana Peres	(New Zealand) Lani Daniels
Nickname	The Shield Maiden	"The Smiling Assassin"
Hometown	Auckland, New Zealand	Whangarei, New Zealand
Purse	$4000	$4000
Pre-fight record	6–1	4–1
Height	5 ft 6 in (1.68 m)	5 ft 6 in (1.68 m)
Weight	78.2 kg (172 lb)	76.2 kg (168 lb)
Style	Orthodox	Orthodox
Recognition	WBA & Boxrec No. 1 Ranked Heavyweight; PBCNZ & NZNBF Light Heavyweight Champion	WBA No. 9 Ranked Heavyweight & Boxrec No. 7 Ranked Heavyweight; NZPBA Light Heavyweight & Pro Box NZ Super Middleweight Champion

Result
- Peres wins via 10-round Unanimous Decision (98-92, 98-92, 96-94)

Geovana Peres vs Lani Daniels II, billed as History In The Making was a boxing rematch between Geovana Peres and Lani Daniels. It took place on 30 March 2019 at SkyCity Convention Centre in Auckland, New Zealand. Peres won the contest by Unanimous decision with two judges scoring the card 98 - 92 and one judge 96 - 94. The fight was considered to be one of the most anticipated sporting events in New Zealand as two New Zealand Boxers fighting for on major World Boxing Title. Geovana Peres is known as the first ever person from the LGBT community to win a New Zealand Professional Boxing title, holding the New Zealand National Boxing Federation and Professional Boxing Commission New Zealand Light Heavyweight Titles. Even though she is Brazilian born, Geovana is a New Zealand citizen and proudly represents New Zealand. Lani Daniels holds the New Zealand Professional Boxing Association Light Heavyweight title and Pro Box NZ Super Middleweight title. She represents her Iwi the Ngāti Hine. She is the second New Zealand Born female to be fighting for a major World title. The first being Daniella Smith, who is from the same hometown as Lani Daniels.

== History ==
=== Background ===
On 16 March 2018 Geovana Peres defended her PBCNZ Light Heavyweight title against Lani Daniels at ABA Stadium in Auckland, New Zealand. The bout was extremely close and Peres almost was knocked down in the ninth round, however, it was ruled a slip. Peres won the bout by a very close Split Decision. After the bout, manager of Lani Daniel's stated they are wanting to have a rematch with Peres as soon as possible. After the fight, Lani Daniels changed her manager and trainer to John Conway. She went on to defeating Nailini Helu in July and Tessa Tualevao in September. After these consecutive wins, Lani received a top 10 ranking in the WBA. As for Geovana, she received a top 5 ranking in the WBA after defeated Lani the first time. She was mostly inactive throughout the year, however, she dominated Trish Vaka in December 2018. After this victory, Geovana raised to 1st in the WBA and on Boxrec.

In December 2018, it was announced that Geovana Peres will take on Lani Daniels in a rematch for the World Boxing Organisation Women's Light Heavyweight title. There has never been a major World Women's champion in the Light Heavyweight division. The event is being promoted by Bruce Glozier of Glozier Boxing. Bruce has stated that seeing a lot of fights in his career can get a bit boring, however, this fight has caught his attention and made it his mission to make this rematch happen for a world title.

Two weeks before the fight, Lani Daniels was nominated for two Sports awards at the 2018 Northland Sports Awards. It was announced on 16 March that Daniels won the Female Boxer of the Year, however she did not win the Sportswomen of the year.

=== Controversy ===
One of the topics that was widely discussed surrounding the event was the pay gap between women's World title fights and the men's World title fights. It was reported that Geovana Peres and Lani Daniels would be taking home 4000 NZD each. Comparing it to Joseph Parker vs. Andy Ruiz, they took home around $500,000 each for their world title fight. The promoter of Geovana Peres vs Lani Daniels II, Bruce Glozier, he was disappointed Geovana and Lani will not be taking home greater earnings. He says it comes down to a lack of sponsorship interest and an as yet unsecured TV deal for the fight. It was till a week or two before the event that Sky TV confirmed that they will record the event and broadcast it later in the week.

== Fight Card ==
Weight Class	Weight		vs.		Method	Round	Time	Notes
Light Heavyweight	175 lbs.	(New Zealand) (Brazil) Geovana Peres	def.	(New Zealand) Lani Daniels	UD	10/10	2:00	^{Note 1}
Heavyweight	200+ lbs.	(New Zealand) Hemi Ahio	def.	(United States) (New Zealand) Julius Long	UD	6/6	3:00
Cruiserweight	200 lbs.	(New Zealand) (Tuvalu) Navosa Ioata	def.	(New Zealand) Thomas Russell	TKO	4/4	2:41
Heavyweight	200+ lbs.	(New Zealand) Michael Cornelius	def.	(Samoa) Viliamu Motusaga	UD	4/4	3:00

^Note 1 For vacant WBO Light Heavyweight title

== Fight Details ==
Geovana Peres vs Lani Daniels was held at SkyCity Convention Centre in Auckland, New Zealand. Tickets for the fight went on sale on 27 January 2019 after Bruce Glozier announced that general admission tickets would be sold at $65. Approximately 200 tickets were sold to the General Public. He elected to distribute the tickets himself through the event Facebook page. 480 tickets were sold for corporate tables, sold between the prices of $2500 - $3300 per table. It was announced on 13 March that the event was officially sold out.

The announcer of the night was Daniel Hennessey. Hennessey is well known in New Zealand as he announced Joseph Parker and all the major world title fights that has happened in New Zealand. Singapore born Australian Phil Austin served as the in-ring referee, and New Zealander Darcy Williams, Filipino Edward Ligas, Australian Chris Condon were the ringside judges. Danny Leigh served as the supervisor and representative for the WBO.

=== Broadcasting ===
On 13 March it was announced that the event will be televised through Sky Sports on Sky TV, with a delayed broadcast.

International broadcasters
Country	Broadcaster
New Zealand	Sky Sports 3

=== Belt ===
The winner of the fight received the world champion belt by the WBO. The belt, valued at around $5 thousand, is of pink colour and has gold-plated motifs with encrusted crystals and features the names of the two fighters and the bout details. The Belt was up for display at the Public work out.

=== Public Work Out ===
On 15 March a public workout was staged outside SkyCity Auckland next to the Sky Tower with some of the events boxers, in a boxing ring. The work featured Geovana Peres, Lani Daniels, Julius Long, Hemi Ahio and Navosa Ioata. Each boxer was interviewed not only by local media but also in the ring by the MC. The Boxers went on to train and do pad work in the ring in front of the general public.

=== Weigh in ===
On 29 March the weigh in was held at SkyCity Theatre. Over 100 people attended the weigh in, filled with media and fight supporters.

== Recap ==
=== Aftermath ===
After the fight the two boxers were interviewed in the middle of the ring. Geovana thanked the sponsors, the promoter, her team and said she fought to inspire women, for women boxing and fighting for equality. She thanked her opponent for the fight and thank the audience for the support. She asked everyone to continue supporting Women's boxing. Lani Daniels thanked her family, her team, and gave a tribute to the victims of the Christchurch mosque shootings. She gave her respect to Geovana Peres and to the audience that came to support her. After all the interviews were done and photos were taken, a haka erupted with over 100 people show respect to Lani and Geovana.

After everyone left and taken photos, Geovana and Lani teams came together in the lockerroom to give each other love, respect and support. This was a private meeting between the two camps with no media or camera. They shared a prayer and wished each the best for the future.

Geovana went on to defend the title against Claire Hafner on October 4, 2019. In May 2023, Lani Daniels Would get another world title opportunity against Alrie Meleisea at an event dubbed Next World Champion.

=== Scorecard ===
Darcy Williams		Edward Ligas		Chris Condon	
Peres	Daniels	Peres	Daniels	Peres	Daniels
98	92	96	94	98	92
