= Lani Daniels vs Alrie Meleisea =

Boxing competition

Next World Champion
- Date: 27 May 2023
- Venue: Eventfinda Stadium, Auckland, New Zealand
- Title on the line: Inaugural IBF Heavyweight Championship

Tale of the tape
Boxer	(New Zealand) (Māori people) Lani Daniels	(New Zealand) (Samoa) Alrie Meleisea
Nickname	The Smiling Assassin	
Hometown	Pipiwai, New Zealand	Auckland, New Zealand
Pre-fight record	7–2–2	6–1–1
Height	5 ft 6 in (1.68 m)	5 ft 7 in (1.70 m)
Style	Orthodox	Orthodox
Recognition	WBA No. 2, WBO, WBC, IBF, WBO, ESPN & Boxrec No. 1 Ranked Heavyweight; Three Time New Zealand Champion; ANBF Australasian Champion; Former WBO World title Challenger	IBF, WBO, ESPN & Boxrec No. 2 Ranked Heavyweight; Two time New Zealand Champion; UBF Asia Pacific Champion

Result
- Daniels wins by unanimous decision (98–92, 98–92, 99–91)

Lani Daniels vs Alrie Meleisea, billed as Next World Champion was a boxing fight between Lani Daniels and Alrie Meleisea. It took place on 27 May 2023 at Eventfinda Stadium in Auckland, New Zealand. This fight made history for being the first World title between two New Zealand-born boxers and the first World title between Maori and Pasifika people. Lani Daniels is well known for her first world title opportunity when she fought against Geovana Peres in their rematch dubbed History In The Making. Daniels three New Zealand title including the NZPBA Light Heavyweight title, Pro Box New Zealand Light Heavyweight title and Pro Box New Zealand Super Middleweight title. She represents her Iwi the Ngāti Hine. She is the second New Zealand Born female to be fighting for a major World title. The first being Daniella Smith, who is from the same hometown as Lani Daniels. Alrie Meleisea is a New Zealand born Samoan who has won three titles in her career including the NZPBA Heavyweight title, UBF Asia Pacific title and Pro Box New Zealand title.

== History ==
=== Background ===
Daniels vs Meleisea was originally scheduled to take part on the Joseph Parker vs. Junior Fa Undercard in February 2021, however, it was boxing politics that stopped this fight from happening. Negotiations picked up again after Meleisea defeated Sequita Hemingway In December 2022. It was confirmed on the 9th January 2023 that discussions had been happening since Christmas. Shortly after the announcement, it was confirmed that the world title was set to happen for the vacant IBF World Heavyweight title. Promoter Kovacevic has stated he was working on making this fight for a unification for the WBO and IBF title, however, as of January 21, IBF title was only confirmed. As of result of the world title being booked, the IBF created their first World Heavyweight Women's rankings in eight years.

Leading into the fight, Daniels opted to fight in a warm up fight on March 10 again Sequita Hemingway in a rematch for the historical ANBF Heavyweight title. It was considered a big risk as a loss for Daniels could affectively cancel the world title on the fight. Meleisea has gone straight into training camp instead for the fight against Daniels. On March 10, Daniels won her fight against Sequita Hemingway by unanimous decision, winning the ANBF Australasian Heavyweight title.

On the 15th May, former WBO World Heavyweight Champion Joseph Parker stated his support for Meleisea. Heavyweight boxing legend David Tua Also showed his support on Radio Samoa for Meleisea leading into the fight.

Lani Daniels reveal that this world title fight against Alrie Meleisea might be her retirement fight for her professional boxing career. Daniels has stated she would continue her career if the money was right. Professional boxing judge and boxing commentator Benjamin Watt has predicted that Daniels would win the first three rounds of the fight, but after that, anything could happen.

== Fight card ==
Weight Class	Weight		vs.		Method	Round	Time	Notes
Heavyweight	175 + lbs.	(New Zealand) (Māori people) Lani Daniels	def.	(New Zealand) (Samoa) Alrie Meleisea	UD	10		^{Note 1}
Super Flyweight	115 lbs.	(Mexico) Jaqueline Mucio	def.	(New Zealand) (United Kingdom) Michelle Preston Munoz	TD	6 (8)
Cruiserweight	200 lbs.	(New Zealand) Ioane Auvaa	def.	(New Zealand) Tyrone Warren	TKO	3 (4)
Catchweight	137.7 lbs.	(New Zealand) (South Africa) Zain Adams	def.	(New Zealand) (Republic of the Congo) Obedi Maguchi	TKO	1 (4)	2:40

^Note 1 For the vacant IBF World Heavyweight title

== Fight Details ==
The event was promoted by Vasco Kovačević who is also Meleisea's Trainer and Manager. This was the first televised event that Kovačević has put on. The fight was fought at Eventfinda Stadium, formerly known as North Shore Events Centre, in North Shore, Auckland New Zealand. General Adminssion Tickets for the fight went on sale with Eventfinda and Corporate tables were sold with Vasco Kovačević RLCA. General Admission tickets sold at $58.38 for a single ticket or $210.96 for four tickets. Door Sales were sold at $78.88. Corporate tables were sold between $1080 and $2500. Mika Haka performed the national anthem for New Zealand.

=== Broadcasting ===
On the 3rd of February it was announced that the world title would be broadcast in New Zealand with Sky Sports on Sky TV. The event would be free for Sky Customers who has the Sky Sports package. However Sky customers without Sky Sports Package and non Sky Customers are able to watch the event on "Sky Sports Now" website with a one off one week subscription of sky sports for $20. On the 22nd of February, it was announced that FITE was interested in broadcasting the event internationally. Fite PPV cost $19.99 Australia $14.99 USA, Canada, United Kingdom and Ireland. $9.99 rest of the world. Combat Sports Network New Zealand was broadcasting the event for $29.99 for a one off one week subscription to the website streaming service.

International broadcasters
Country	Broadcaster
New Zealand	Sky Sports Pop Up
Rest of the world	FITE
Rest of the world	Combat Service Network New Zealand

=== Media build up ===
On the 12th April, there was a press conference that was dub the first face off between Lani Daniels and Alrie Meleisea, However, Daniels was not able to make it due to covid. Promoter Vasco Kovacevic stated to Newshub "We don't give it to them until after they've actually achieved something, but most of the time, it's bandwagon". On the 5th May, all of the event team as well as the camps of Daniels and Meleisea were welcomed onto the Orakei Marae. This was to welcome both fighter onto the Marae, to pay their respects and to pay respects to the first Maori world champion Daniella Smith. This was where Meleisea stated its nothing personal its strictly business, which was a common saying being used in the build up for the David Tua vs Shane Cameron fight.

== Aftermath ==
After winning the fight, the town of Pipiwai started planning a parade for Daniels to walk in, to celebrate her achievements. The parade took place on the 2 June with 300 people attended the event, which is more than the population of Pipiwai itself.
