= John Conway (boxer) =

New Zealand boxer (born 1968)

- Born: John Conway; 8 March 1968 (age 58)
- Other names: The Rebel
- Nationality: New Zealander
- Weight: 78.8 kg (174 lb; 12 st 6 lb)
- Division: Light Heavyweight
- Style: Boxing; Kickboxing
- Trainer: Lollo Heimuli; Peter Flynn; Tojo Dixion
- Years active: 1999–2003, 2011

Professional boxing record
- Total: 14
- Wins: 11
- By knockout: 2
- Losses: 2
- By knockout: 2
- Draws: 1

Kickboxing record
- Total: 58
- Wins: 48
- Losses: 9
- Draws: 1

Amateur record
- Total: 111
- Wins: 90
- Losses: 20
- Draws: 1

Other information
- Occupation: President of NZPBA
- Boxing record from BoxRec
- Last updated on: 20 February 2017

John Conway (born 8 March 1968, New Zealand) is a retired professional boxer and kickboxer. Conway biggest boxing bout of his career was challenging for the WBO Asia Pacific light heavyweight title against Soulan Pownceby in June 2011. Conway has peaked at 11th on the WBO Asia Pacific Rankings. Conway started his boxing career in the amateur in 1986. If you combine his amateur, professional boxing and kickboxing fight, Conway has had 182 fights.

Currently Conway is the president of the New Zealand Professional Boxing Association and has refereed in over 100 boxing bouts. Conway has refereed and judged in many notable boxers including Chauncy Welliver, Michelle Preston, Daniella Smith, Gunnar Jackson, Robert Berridge, Shane Cameron, Jeff Horn, Izuagbe Ugonoh, Kali Meehan, Brian Minto, and Joseph Parker.

Outside being an official, Conway owns his own gym called Rebel Lee Gar and trains many successful boxers and kickboxers including Adrian Taihia, Baby Nansen, Lani Daniels, Richie Hardcore and David Letele.

== NZPBA president ==
In July 2016, Conway became vice President of NZPBA. In February 2017, Lance Revill resigned as president of NZPBA due to the backlash of the comments made against World Champion Joseph Parker. Due to this, Conway was promoted to Interim President of NZPBA.

== Lani Daniels World Champion ==
Conway is the trainer and manager of two division world champion Lani Daniels. When setting up Daniels first world title fight, Conway was in negotiations with opponent Alrie Meleisea manager Vasco Kovačević since Christmas day 2022. In May 2023, Daniels won her IBF world heavyweight title. Daniels originally planned to retire after her world title win, however, after her win, Conway began negotiations with multiple promoters to sign Daniels full time. On the 18th of July it was announced that Daniels had signed a three fight deal with boxing promoter Dean Lonergan under D & L Promotions.

== Fighting titles and awards ==
=== Kickboxing and Muay Thai titles ===
- NZ amateur welterweight kickboxing champion (1991)
- NZ thaiboxing professional welterweight champion (1992–2000)
- South Pacific welterweight champion (1995)
- Hong Kong World welterweight champion (1995)

=== Awards ===
- Balmoral Lee Gar Thai Boxing Most Determined Professional Fighter (1994–1995)

== Professional boxing record ==
14 fights	11 wins	2 losses
By knockout	2	2
By decision	9	0
Draws	1	

No.	Result	Record	Opponent	Type	Round, time	Date	Location	Notes
14	Lose	11–2–1	(New Zealand) Soulan Pownceby	TKO	11 (12) 1:22	17 June 2011	ABA Stadium, Auckland, New Zealand	WBO Asia Pacific light heavyweight title
13	Win	11–1–1	(New Zealand) Dickey Peirera	UD	4	14 April 2011	ABA Stadium, Auckland, New Zealand	
12	Win	10–1–1	(New Zealand) Fale Siaoloa	UD	4	19 March 2011	Vodafone Events Centre, Manukau City, New Zealand	
11	Win	9–1–1	(Samoa) Niusila Seiuli	UD	4	4 March 2011	ASB Stadium, Kohimarama, New Zealand	
10	Lose	8–1–1	(New Zealand) Tapanuu Tagilimai	TKO	1 (4)	30 October 2003	ABA Stadium, Auckland, New Zealand	
9	Win	8–0–1	(New Zealand) Simon Taliavao Talia	TKO	3 (4)	14 December 2002	YMCA Stadium, Auckland, New Zealand	
8	Win	7–0–1	(New Zealand) Simon Taliavao Talia	KO	2 (6)	12 April 2002	Hamilton Leisure Centre, Waikato, New Zealand	
7	Win	6–0–1	(New Zealand) Jimmy Fale	PTS	6	16 February 2002	ASB Stadium, Kohimarama, New Zealand	
6	Win	5–0–1	(New Zealand) Brett Fannin	PTS	6	13 December 2001	St.James Theatre, Auckland, New Zealand	
5	Win	4–0–1	(New Zealand) Jason Costa	PTS	6	24 August 2001	Meteor Night Club, Hamilton, New Zealand	
4	Win	3–0–1	(New Zealand) Jake Rasmussen	PTS	6	28 June 2001	ASB Stadium, Kohimarama, New Zealand	
3	Draw	2–0–1	(New Zealand) Jamie Waru	PTS	6	29 July 2000	Northland Memorial Hall, Dargaville, New Zealand	
2	Win	2–0	(United Kingdom) Graham McLaughlan	PTS	4	13 May 2000	Alexandra Park Raceway, Auckland, New Zealand	
1	Win	1–0	(New Zealand) Peter Mokomoko	PTS	6	25 November 1999	ASB Stadium, Kohimarama, New Zealand	Professional debut

== Awards and recognitions ==
- 2019 Gladrap Boxing Awards Trainer of the year (Nominated)
- 2019 Gladrap Boxing Awards Referee of the year (Nominated)
- 2021 New Zealand Boxing Awards Referee of the year (Won)
- 2022 New Zealand Boxing Awards Referee of the year (Won)
