= Lani Daniels =

New Zealand boxer (born 1988)

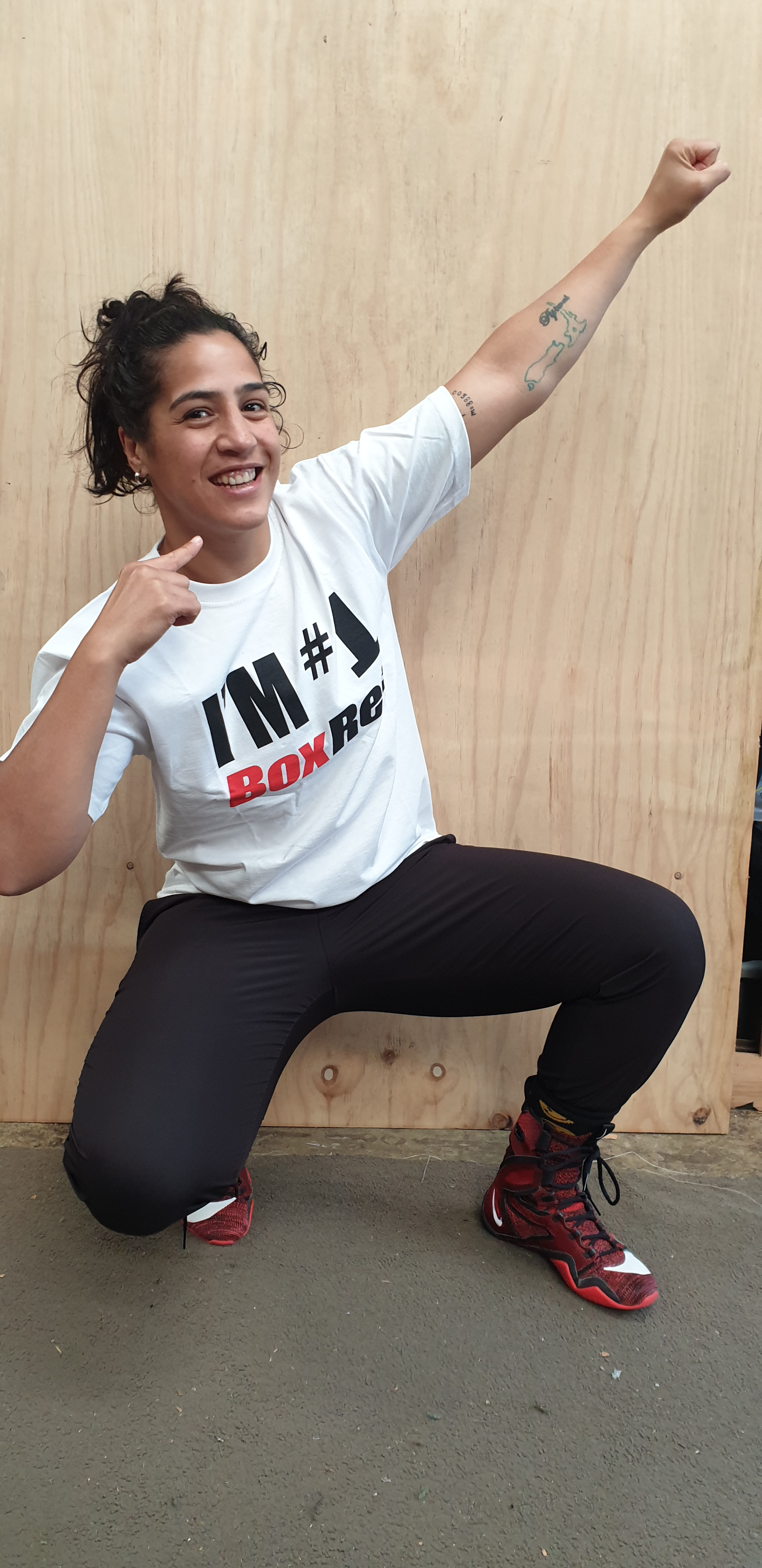
- Daniels in #1 BoxRec shirt
- Born: Te Arani Moana Daniels; 15 July 1988 (age 38); Whangārei, New Zealand
- Other names: The Smiling Assassin
- Height: 169 cm (5 ft 7 in)
- Weight: 76.0 kg (168 lb; 12 st 0 lb)
- Division: Middleweight; Super-middleweight; Light-heavyweight; Heavyweight
- Stance: Orthodox
- Team: Tukaha Boxing and fitness Rebel Lee Gar (2018 - 2025); NJE Promotions(2017); Glozier Boxing(2019); D & L Events (2023); Nabby's Boxing GYM (Amateur Career)
- Trainer: John Conway (2018 - 2025); Daniella Smith (2026 - Present)
- Years active: 2017–present

Professional boxing record
- Total: 18
- Wins: 12
- By knockout: 2
- Losses: 4
- By knockout: 0
- Draws: 2

Other information
- Occupation: Professional Boxer; Registered Nurse
- University: Waikato Institute of Technology
- Boxing record from BoxRec

Te Arani Moana "Lani" Daniels (born 15 July 1988) is a New Zealand professional boxer who has held the WBO and IBF female super-middleweight titles since April 2026. She is the first New Zealand-born boxer of Māori descent to be a three-division world boxing champion, having held the IBF female heavyweight title between May and December 2023, and the IBF female light-heavyweight title between December 2023 and December 2025. She is the fourth boxer of Maori descent to win a world boxing championship. She is the first New Zealander to win the Ring Magazine world title in history.

== Early life ==
Daniels is one of nine siblings. At the age of 14, Daniels' younger brother died of leukemia at the age of 11. This led to Daniels turning to drugs and alcohol with contemplation of suicide. She first boxed at a charity event, after which she began training alongside her sister Caroline, who was already fighting as an amateur boxer. Since then, Lani turned her life around and became a mental health nurse. She fights alongside her sister Caroline with both of them being amateur and, later on, professional boxers. They have said they will never fight each other, similarly to the Klitschko brothers. Her family are members of the Church of Jesus Christ of Latter-Day Saints, sometimes referred to as Mormon.

== Amateur career ==
Daniels originally started boxing to lose weight alongside her sister. Daniels began her career in the amateur division. She first started with her sister Caroline in Hamilton under the coach Dion McNabney at Nabby's Boxing GYM. Daniels is a two-time New Zealand amateur boxing champion, winning the titles in 2014 and 2015. Its estimated she has fought around 30 amateur boxing fights and 4 corporate fights

== Professional career ==
=== Debut to multiple national champion 2017 – 2018 ===
In September 2017, Daniels made her professional debut against another debutant boxer Trish Vaka on the Big Bash Boxing Promotion. Lani Daniels won bout by Unanimous Decision. In November 2017, Daniels fought Vaka again in a rematch, but this time for the vacant NZPBA Light Heavyweight Title. Daniels won the bout by unanimous decision, winning all of the scheduled rounds by two judges and picking up her first title.

In March 2018, Daniels took on another New Zealand champion Geovana Peres. Peres at the time before the belt held both New Zealand National Boxing Federation and Professional Boxing Commission Light Heavyweight titles. Geovana Peres was defending her PBCNZ Light Heavyweight title in the bout against Daniels. It was a close bout, however Daniels lost bout by split decision, suffering her first professional defeat. In July 2018, Daniels defended her NZPBA title against former world ranked boxer Nailini Helu. The bout went the full 8 rounds with Lani Daniels almost winning all the rounds, winning the bout by unanimous decision retaining the title. In September 2018, Daniels fought Tessa Tualevao for the vacant Pro Box NZ Super Middleweight title in Cambridge, New Zealand. Daniels won the bout by unanimous decision, winning her second professional title.

=== World title contender, Tualevao Rivalry 2019 ===
On 17 December 2018, it was announced that Daniels will be going against Geovana Peres in a rematch for the WBO light heavyweight title. The event took place on 30 March 2019 in Auckland, New Zealand. Daniels lost the bout by unanimous decision.

On 19 June 2019, it was announced that a rematch between Daniels and Tessa Tualevao would happen on 2 August 2019, at ABA Stadium for the vacant New Zealand Professional Boxing Commission Female middleweight title. During the announcement it was revealed that Daniels was still ranked 5th on the WBA world rankings. This was the first time that Daniels fought in the middleweight division in her professional career. The fight reached the full 8 round but the bout ended in a draw, leaving the belt to remain vacant. On 13 August 2019, Bruce Glozier announced that the third bout between Daniels and Tessa Tualevao would happen on 4 October 2019, at Sky City Convention Centre. This was for the vacant New Zealand Professional Boxing Commission Female middleweight title. This fight was on the undercard of the Geovana Peres vs. Claire Hafner World title fight night.

=== Comeback, Receiving Call outs 2021 – 2022 ===
On 27 February 2021, Daniels was scheduled to make her in-ring return to fight Alrie Meleisea for a major world title. Unfortunately, there were a lot of problems with behind the scenes which went from being for a world title, to an intercontinental title, to a regional title, to it being a national title. Eventually the fight got called off altogether due to boxing politics and communication breakdowns behind the scenes.

On 4 September, Daniels was originally scheduled to return to the ring, to fight at Eden Park. Unfortunately, due to COVID-19 pandemic in New Zealand, the fight got postponed. The fight ended up happening on 30 April 2022 at ABA Stadium against professional rugby player Sequita Hemingway. Daniels won the fight by unanimous decision. A rematch was scheduled to take place on 24 June at The Plaza in Putāruru. However, Hemingway pulled out of the fight shortly after it was announced. Daniels will now take on amateur boxer Tinta Smith for the New Zealand National (Pro Box NZ version) light heavyweight title. Daniels won the fight against Smith by unanimous decision with the fight being reported as very close. After the fight, it was reported that Daniels struggled with her camp for the fight due to having Covid at the beginning of the camp, a leg injury, the flu closer to the fight and a family member suddenly a month before the fight. In July 2022, Daniels received a WBA rankings of 3rd in the light heavyweight division. Shortly afterwards, Daniels received another increase in the rankings to not only 2nd in the WBA, but also 1st in the WBC. In November 2022, South African national women's champion Razel Mohammed took to social media demanding a fight against Daniels.

=== World title fight, Hemingway rematch, Alrie Meleisea Rivalry, D & L Promotions 2023 ===
On 9 December, Alrie Meleisea defeated Sequita Hemingway for the Pro Box NZ heavyweight title. After her fight, Meleisea asked if she would be interested in a world title fight against Daniels. She replied “Anytime, anywhere, any place,” officially calling out Daniels. In January 2023, it was announced that Daniels was in negotiations with Meleisea team for a potencial world title fight in May. Also in January, it was announced that negotiations were happening to have a tuneup fight against Sequita Hemingway before the world title fight. On 14 January, it was announced that Daniels' fight against Sequita Hemingway was confirmed for 10 March at ABA Stadium for the historical vacant ANBF Australasian heavyweight title. This will be a warm up fight for the world title. On the same day it was confirmed that Daniels would take on Meleisea for the first-ever IBF World women's heavyweight title on 27 May at Eventfinda Stadium. The intentions for the Hemingway fight is not only to be a tune up fight but also to help pay the bills for the world title fight. On March 10, Daniels won her fight against Sequita Hemingway by unanimous decision, winning the ANBF Australasian Heavyweight title. Lani Daniels reveal that this world title fight against Alrie Meleisea might be her retirement fight for her professional boxing career. Daniels won the fight by unanimous decision, securing the IBF world heavyweight title. Daniels has stated she would continue her career if the money was right. On 18 July it was announced that Daniels had signed a three fight deal with boxing promoter Dean Lonergan under D & L Promotions. At the same time, It was announced that Daniels will defend her world title against South African boxer Razel Mohammed on 26 August at Eventfinda Stadium. Daniels retains her World title in dominating fashion, winning the fight by TKO, giving her the first Stoppage win of her career. For her last fight of 2023, she will fight for the first time in her boxing career in her hometown of Northland. Daniels will take on Desley Robinson for the vacant IBF World light heavyweight title. If Daniels win this fight, she would become the first New Zealand born and first Maori to win two world titles, as well as two world titles in two different weight divisions. On 7 November, it was announced that the event was sold out. Daniels won the fight by Majority decision, becoming a two division world champion.

=== Title defense against Oluwole, Salita Promotions deal 2024 - 2025 ===
Daniels successfully defended her light-heavyweight title against the previously unbeaten Bolatito Oluwole at Claudelands Arena, Hamilton, on 7 September 2024, winning by unanimous decision.

She signed a contract with Salita Promotions in April 2025. Shortly after, it was announced that Daniels would take on Claressa Shields for the undisputed world heavyweight titles. Daniels would lose the fight by unanimous decision.

=== End of championship reign 2025 ===
In October 2025, it was announced that Daniels would defend her world title against Sarah Scheurich in Germany. Daniels lost her title to Sarah Scheurich via unanimous decision at Lambert Arena im Weberpark in Göppingen, Baden-Württemberg, Germany, on 6 December 2025. It was noted that this was the first time since the beginning of Daniels's career that she fought without her regular trainer John Conway.

=== Becomg three division world champion 2026 ===
In 2026, Daniels started training under Daniella Smith, who is known for being the first ever IBF Women's world champion. Daniels challenged WBO and IBF female super-middleweight champion Shadasia Green at The Theater at Madison Square Garden in New York City, United States, on 17 April 2026, winning by technical knockout in the ninth round. Following the bout Green was taken from the ring on a stretcher and transported to hospital although in a post-fight press conference her promotor, Nakisa Bidarian, said she was "awake and talkative". Green later revealed in a post on social media that she had suffered a brain bleed and was treated in an intensive care unit. As soon as Daniels returned back to New Zealand, she returned back to work as a nurse.

== Celebrity SAS: Who Dares Wins ==
Daniels took part in the British quasi-military training reality television show Celebrity SAS: Who Dares Wins which was aired on Channel 4 in September and October 2024. She was one of two contestants to successfully complete the course.

== Personal life ==
Daniels is a descendant of Te Tai Tokerau. She is from the Iwi Ngāti Hine which is part of the wider Ngāpuhi. She also belongs to the Hapū Te Orewai. When she isn't boxing, Daniels is a mental health nurse. She currently resides in the small town of Pipiwai. Outside her own training, Daniels trains her family and the community for free, to give back to the youth and community.

== Boxing titles ==
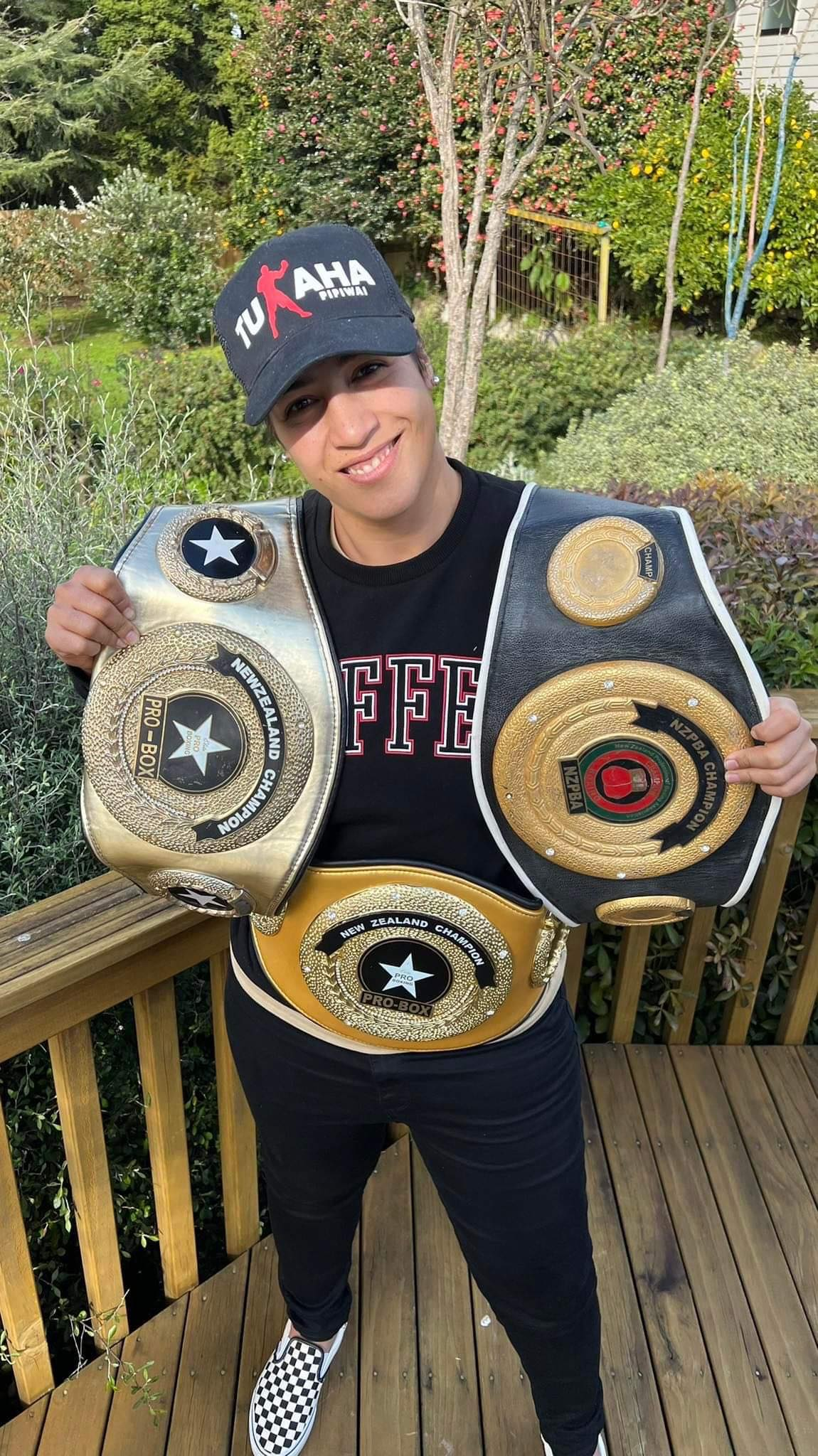
Daniels holding her three New Zealand titles

=== Amateur boxing ===
- Boxing NZ
  - New Zealand Amateur Light Heavyweight (2014)
  - New Zealand Amateur Middleweight (2015)
  - Bobby Johnson Cup (Most Scientific boxer at the 2015 New Zealand national amateur championships)

=== Professional boxing ===
- New Zealand Professional Boxing Association
  - New Zealand National Light Heavyweight title (171 Ibs)
- Pro Box NZ
  - New Zealand National Super Middleweight title (167 Ibs)
  - New Zealand National Light Heavyweight title
- Australian National Boxing Federation
  - Australasian Heavyweight title
- International Boxing Federation
  - World Heavyweight title
  - World Light Heavyweight title
  - World Super Middleweight title
- World Boxing Organization
  - World Super Middleweight title
- The Ring (magazine)
  - World Super Middleweight title

== Professional boxing record ==
18 fights	12 wins	4 losses
By knockout	2	0
By decision	10	4
Draws	2	

No.	Result	Record	Opponent	Type	Round, time	Date	Location	Notes
18	Win	12–4–2	Shadasia Green	TKO	9 (10), 0:32	17 Apr 2026	The Theater at Madison Square Garden, New York City, New York, U.S.	Won IBF, WBO and The Ring female super-middleweight titles
17	Loss	11–4–2	Sarah Scheurich	UD	10	6 Dec 2025	Lambert Arena im Weberpark, Göppingen, Germany	Lost IBF female light-heavyweight title
16	Loss	11–3–2	Claressa Shields	UD	10	26 Jul 2025	Little Caesars Arena, Detroit, Michigan, U.S.	For WBA, WBC, IBF, WBO and WBF female heavyweight titles
15	Win	11–2–2	Bolatito Oluwole	UD	10	7 Sep 2024	Claudelands Arena, Hamilton, New Zealand	Retained IBF female light-heavyweight title
14	Win	10–2–2	Desley Robinson	MD	10	2 Dec 2023	McKay Stadium, Whangarei, New Zealand	Won inaugural IBF female light-heavyweight title
13	Win	9–2–2	Razel Mohammed	TKO	4 (10), 0:56	26 Aug 2023	Eventfinda, Auckland, New Zealand	Retained IBF female heavyweight title
12	Win	8–2–2	Alrie Meleisea	UD	10	27 May 2023	Eventfinda, Auckland, New Zealand	Won inaugural IBF female heavyweight title
11	Win	7–2–2	Sequita Hemingway	UD	8	10 Mar 2023	ABA Stadium, Auckland, New Zealand	Won vacant ANBF Australasian female heavyweight title
10	Win	6–2–2	Tinta Smith	UD	8	24 Jun 2022	Don Rowlands Event Centre, Lake Karapiro, New Zealand	
9	Win	5–2–2	Sequita Hemingway	UD	6	30 Apr 2022	ABA Stadium, Auckland, New Zealand	
8	Draw	4–2–2	Tessa Tualevao	SD	8	4 Oct 2019	SkyCity, Auckland, New Zealand	For vacant PBCNZ female middleweight title
7	Draw	4–2–1	Tessa Tualevao	MD	8	2 Aug 2019	ABA Stadium, Auckland, New Zealand	For vacant PBCNZ female middleweight title
6	Loss	4–2	Geovana Peres	UD	10	30 Mar 2019	SkyCity, Auckland, New Zealand	For vacant WBO female light-heavyweight title
5	Win	4–1	Tessa Tualevao	UD	8	22 Sep 2018	Cambridge Raceway, Cambridge, New Zealand	
4	Win	3–1	Nailini Helu	UD	8	14 Jul 2018	AMI Netball Centre, Auckland, New Zealand	Retained NZPBA female light-heavyweight title
3	Loss	2–1	Geovana Peres	SD	10	16 Mar 2018	ABA Stadium, Auckland, New Zealand	For PBCNZ female light-heavyweight title
2	Win	2–0	Trish Vaka	UD	8	18 Nov 2017	Cambridge Raceway, Cambridge, New Zealand	Won vacant NZPBA female light-heavyweight title
1	Win	1–0	Trish Vaka	UD	4	1 Sep 2017	AMI Netball Centre, Auckland, New Zealand	

== Basketball ==
Lani Daniels
No. 7 – Te Tai Tokerau Northland Phoenix
- Title: Point Guard
- League: WBC New Zealand

Career information
- Playing career: 2016–2019
- Position: Point Guard
- Number: 7

Career history
- 2016–2019: Te Tai Tokerau Northland Phoenix

Between 2016 and 2018, Daniels played basketball for the Te Tai Tokerau Northland Phoenix, competing at the New Zealand Women's Basketball Championships. Daniels was the Phoenix team lead scorer in 2017. Daniels competed in two National Championship tournaments. In 2017, the Phoenix finished eleventh place on the standings. In 2018, the team competed in the tier 2 conference, coming in fourth place.

== Awards and recognitions ==
- Boxing New Zealand
  - 2015 Bobby Johnson Cup Most Scientific boxer (Won)
- Northland Sports Awards
  - 2018 Female Boxer of the Year (Won)
  - 2018 Fireco Sportswomen of the Year (Nominated)
  - 2022 Fireco Sportswoman of the Year (Nominated)
  - 2023 Sportswoman of the Year (Won)
  - 2023 Northland Sports Supreme of the Year (Won)
  - 2024 Sportswoman of the Year (Won)
  - 2024 Northland Sports Supreme of the Year (Won)
- New Zealand Boxing Awards
  - 2019 Female boxer of the year (Nominated)
  - 2019 New Zealand Fight of the year (Won)
  - 2019 Best looking female boxer of the year (Won)
  - 2023 New Zealand Fight of the year (Won)
- Te Tai Tokerau Māori Sports Awards
  - 2023 Te Tohu TaKaro Toa Wahine Outstanding Sportswoman Award (Nominated)
- Maori Sports Awards
  - 2023 Te Pikinga o Tawhaki Individual Māori World Champions (Won)
- Halberg Awards
  - 2023 High Performance Sport New Zealand Sportswoman of the Year (Nominated)

== Filmography ==
=== Television ===
Year	Title	Role	Note
2023	Breakfast	Self	
2023	7 Days	Self	
2024	Celebrity SAS: Who Dares Wins	Self	Series 6

== See also ==
- List of female boxers
- List of boxing triple champions

Sporting positions
National boxing titles
New title	NZPBA light-heavyweight champion November 18, 2017 – May 27, 2023; Won world title	Vacant
New title	Pro Box NZ super-middleweight champion September 22, 2018 – May 27, 2023; Won world title	Vacant
New title	Pro Box NZ light-heavyweight champion June 24, 2022 – May 27, 2023; Won world title	Vacant
Regional boxing titles
New title	ANBF Australasian heavyweight champion March 10, 2023 – May 27, 2023; Won world title	Vacant Title next held by Che Kenneally
World boxing titles
Inaugural champion	IBF heavyweight champion May 27, 2023 – December 15, 2023; Vacated	Vacant Title next held by Claressa Shields
Inaugural champion	IBF light-heavyweight champion December 2, 2023 – December 6, 2025	Succeeded by Sarah Scheurich
Preceded by Shadasia Green	IBF super-middleweight champion April 17, 2026 – present	Incumbent
Preceded by Shadasia Green	WBO super-middleweight champion April 17, 2026 – present	Incumbent
Preceded by Shadasia Green	The Ring super-middleweight champion April 17, 2026 – present	Incumbent
