= Boxing and Wrestling Act 1981 =

Act of Parliament in New Zealand

New Zealand Parliament
- Long title: An Act to make better provision for regulating the promotion and conduct of boxing and wrestling contests, and to abolish the regulation of certain amateur wrestling contests.
- Royal assent: 16 September 1981
- Commenced: 16 September 1981
- Administered by: Department of Internal Affairs

Legislative history
- Introduced by: Brian Talboys
- Passed: 2 February 1981
- Status: Current legislation

The Boxing and Wrestling Act 1981 passed in 1981 in New Zealand is an Act of Parliament. The Act replaced the Boxing and Wrestling Regulations 1958. The Act has professional wrestling and boxing in an amateur, corporate, exhibition and professional level to require a police permit for the event to take place under an approved organisation. The Act is administrated by The Department of Internal Affairs.

== Interpretation ==
A boxing or wrestling event requires an association (whether corporate or unincorporate) to officiate the event. Every event needs to have an approved police permit from the district police department. The police will do a small background check on all the boxers and approve or decline the boxer's participation depending on any active or past criminal charges or court hearings. Creating a new association to be allowed to officiate can be a lengthy process and requires the association to have a recommendation from the Commissioner of Police, a constitution, suitability of the rules, names and addresses of the members of the executive committee and more. The act also specifies that the permit is required when there is charge of administrated or contribution is put toward the event. It also requires money when people "...contribute money or to throw money into the ring or to otherwise deposit it in the building where the contest is held or elsewhere, or on the result of which any stake, payment, or prize depends."

== Exclusions ==
In the Act, it quotes "but does not include any of those forms of physical combat commonly known as the Asian martial arts". This means the Act excludes MMA Fighting, Kickboxing, Muay Thai Fighting, Bareknuckle fighting, Karate, Judo, Taekwondo and more combat sports. In recent years, Asian martial arts have become a vague loophole that promoters have used to get around the legislation, by getting boxers to take their shoes off as they compete. In 2017, a new sport was created to get around the legislation called Mod Boxing, which is essentially Muay Thai Fighting without any kicks.

== Exemptions ==
Certain martial arts organisations, such as those affiliated with the Global Association of Mixed Martial Arts (GAMMA) AKA the World Martial Arts Federation (WMAF), operate under independent sanctioning bodies and are not governed by the Boxing and Wrestling Act 1981. These groups are recognised as martial arts organisations rather than boxing or wrestling promoters, and as such, are not subject to the licensing and permit requirements set out in the Act.

== Registered organisations ==
- Arena Wrestling Alliance
- Auckland Boxing Association
- Australasian Wrestling and Martial Arts Association Inc
- Bay of Plenty Boxing Association Inc
- Boxing Canterbury Metro Association Inc
- Canterbury Boxing Association
- Central Auckland Boxing Association Incorporated
- Central Hawkes Bay Boxing Association
- Central North Island Boxing Association
- East Coast Boxing Association Inc
- Hawkes Bay Boxing Association
- Kirikiriroa Boxing Association
- Kiwi Pro Wrestling Ltd
- Manawatu Boxing Association
- Masterton and Districts Boxing Association
- National Wrestling Association
- Nelson Boxing Association Inc
- New Zealand National Boxing Federation Inc
- New Zealand Olympic Wrestling Union Inc
- New Zealand Professional Boxing Association
- Otago Boxing Association
- Pro Box NZ Association
- Professional Boxing Commission New Zealand
- Shamrock Boxing Association Inc
- South Auckland Boxing Association
- South Pacific Wrestling Association
- Southland Boxing Association
- Taranaki Boxing Association
- Timaru Boxing Association
- Waikato Amateur Boxing Association
- Waikato Wrestling Association
- Wellington Hutt Valley Boxing Association

== Petition for change ==
In December 2018, Boxing Judge Benjamin Thomas Watt created a petition to update the Boxing and Wrestling Act 1981 to include all combat sports. This petition came after the death of Kain Parsons, Lucy Brown and a serious knockout to Joel Rea which all happen within 5 months of the petition. New Zealand First politician Shane Jones pledging changes to the Boxing and Wrestling Act following an inner rival gang fight night in 2017. Only 49 signatures were obtained, and no further progress happened. In November 2022, Benjamin Thomas Watt created a new petition in hopes to create a combat sports authority. However, Watt petition failed a second time.
