= Trish Vaka =

New Zealand boxer and rugby union player (born 1986)

- Full name: Patricia Amelia Vaka
- Born: Patricia Amelia Vaka; 17 May 1986 (age 40) Okaihau, New Zealand
- Height: 170 cm (5 ft 7 in)
- Weight: 86 kg (190 lb)
- School: Okaihau College
- Occupation(s): Professional boxer Rugby union player Personal trainer

Rugby union career
- Position: Hooker/Lock
- Current team: Northland Kauri
Amateur team(s)
Years	Team	Apps	(Points)
2014 - Present	Kaikohe RFC		
Provincial / State sides
Years	Team	Apps	(Points)
2019 - Present	Northland Kauri	36	(20)

Patricia Amelia Vaka (born 17 May 1986) is a New Zealand professional rugby union player and professional boxer.

In 2019, the Northland women's rugby team known as the Northland Kauri made their debut in the Women's Provincial Championship, now known as the Farah Palmer Cup. Vaka was named one of the original founding players for Northland in the Championships. In 2023, the Northland Kauri won their first Farah Palmer Cup Championship.

As a professional boxer, she has fought some of the world's best boxers in Australasia including retired WBO light heavyweight champion Geovana Peres, two division IBF World champion Lani Daniels and world title contender Desley Robinson. Vaka has peaked at 4th on Boxrec and 7th on the WBC World Heavyweight Rankings.

== Rugby union ==
=== Kaikohe rugby ===
In 2022, Vaka played four games for the Kaikohe women's rugby team, with one bye and a game that was deemed a draw, however did not take place due to COVID. Vaka scored one try within the first minute against HH Women Rugby Team. Kaikohe won one out of the four games of the season.

=== Northland Kauri ===
In 2019, Northland reached the semi-finals, playing against Hawkes Bay. Vaka was named the number 4 for the game. Hawkes Bay won the game with a score of 46–31.

In 2020, Vaka was named in the Northland Kauri team, however the team did not reach the finals this year.

On 20 August 2022, Vaka played for Northland against Taranaki at TET Stadium & Events Centre. 56 minutes and 35 seconds into the game, Vaka scored her first try of her Farah Palmer Cup career. Northland won the game by 29 - 15. In September 2022, Northland Reached the semi-finals, playing against Hawkes Bay for the third time. Vaka was named the number 2 for the game. Hawkes Bay won the game with a score of 28–19.

On 19 August 2023, Vaka came off the bench to score her second try with the Northland Kauri team against Tasman. In September 2023, The Northland Kauri won their first Championships.

On 1 September 2024, Northland Kauri announced on social media that Vaka played her 30th game with the team and in the Farah Palmer Cup.

=== Playing achievements ===
Year	Northland (NPC)	Awards	Career Highlight
2019	Semi Finals		Debut appearance
2020	3rd on the Standings		First Try of her career
2021	Semi Finals		
2022	3rd on the Standings		
2023	Champions		Champions
2024	Last on the standings		

== Boxing ==
Trish Vaka
Personal information
- Nationality: New Zealand
- Height: 170 cm (5 ft 7 in)
- Weight: Heavyweight; Light Heavyweight; Super Middleweight; Middleweight

Boxing career

Boxing record
- Total fights: 12
- Wins: 1
- Win by KO: 1
- Losses: 8
- Draws: 2
- No contests: 1

=== fighting some of the best ===
On 1 September 2017, Vaka made her professional boxing debut against Lani Daniels. Daniels won the fight by unanimous decision. In her third fight of her professional career, Vaka took on Geovana Peres for the vacant New Zealand national (PBCNZ version) light heavyweight title. Peres won the fight by unanimous decision. In November 2017, Vaka took on Daniels in a rematch for the vacant New Zealand national (NZPBA version) light heavyweight title. Daniels won the fight by unanimous decision. In August 2018, Vaka made her Australian debut when she took on undefeated Natalie Jenkinson. Vaka received her first victory of her professional boxing career, winning the fight by 2nd-round knockout. After the fight she receive a ranking of 8th in the world on Boxrec. In December 2018, Vaka took on Peres in a rematch. This was a fight before Peres went on to win the world light heavyweight title. Peres won the fight by unanimous decision. Despite her loss, she still maintained a ranking of 10th on Boxrec. In November 2019, Vaka fought on the Geovana Peres vs. Claire Hafner world title undercard making her New Zealand television debut. She took on undefeated Australian boxer Desley Robinson. Robinson won the fight by Unanimous Decision. Outside of competing, Vaka is a boxing professional trainer.

=== Comeback ===
In November 2023, it was announced that Vaka would make her in ring return on the dual world title undercard that would happen at McKay Stadium in Whangarei, New Zealand. She will be taking on London resident New Zealander, Roseanna Cox. The fight was an 83 kg catchweight fight. Cox won the fight by unanimous decision. In March 2024, Vaka took on Tinta Smith for the New Zealand cruiserweight title, a weight division rarely seen in women's boxing worldwide. The fight ended in a split decision draw. After losing to Desley Robinson in her first stoppage loss, she would take on combat sports star Genah Fabian in her televised debut, drawing by Majority Decision.

=== Professional boxing record ===
12 fights	1 win	8 losses
By knockout	1	1
By decision	0	7
Draws	2	
No contests	1	

No.	Result	Record	Opponent	Type	Round, time	Date	Location	Notes
12	Draw	1–8–2 (1)	Genah Fabian	MD	4	14 Sep 2024	Viaduct Events Centre, Auckland, New Zealand	
11	Loss	1–8–1 (1)	Desley Robinson	TKO	6 (6) 1:11	11 May 2024	Greek Club, Brisbane, Australia	vacant Australasian (ANBF version) Super Middleweight title
10	Draw	1–7–1 (1)	Tinta Smith	SD	8	16 Mar 2024	Te Rapa Racecourse, Hamilton, New Zealand	inaugural New Zealand national (PBCNZ version) Cruiserweight title
9	Loss	1–7 (1)	Roseanna Cox	UD	6	2 Dec 2023	McKay Stadium, Whangarei, New Zealand	
8	Loss	1–6 (1)	Desley Robinson	UD	4	4 Oct 2019	SkyCity, Auckland, New Zealand	
7	Loss	1–5 (1)	Geovana Peres	UD	6	6 Dec 2018	Ellerslie Event Centre, Auckland, New Zealand	
6	Loss	1–4 (1)	Tessa Tualevao	UD	6	30 Nov 2018	ABA Stadium, Auckland, New Zealand	
5	Win	1–3 (1)	Natalie Jenkinson	KO	2 (4), 0:49	11 Aug 2018	Seagulls Rugby League Club, Tweed Heads, NSW, Australia	
4	Loss	0–3 (1)	Lani Daniels	UD	8	18 Nov 2017	Cambridge Raceway, Cambridge, New Zealand	For vacant New Zealand National (NZPBA version) Light Heavyweight title
3	Loss	0–2 (1)	Geovana Peres	UD	8	13 Oct 2017	ABA Stadium, Auckland, New Zealand	For vacant New Zealand National (PBCNZ version) Light Heavyweight title
2	NC	0–1 (1)	Tessa Tualevao	NC	4	9 Sep 2017	Kaitaia, New Zealand	Originally declared Vaka as the winner, the decision was later change to a No Contest due to referee who was also acting as a judge failed to score two out of four rounds
1	Loss	0–1	Lani Daniels	UD	4	1 Sep 2017	AMI Netball Centre St Johns, Auckland, New Zealand	

== Awards and recognitions ==
- 2018 Northland Sports Award Female Boxer of the Year (Nominated)
- 2018 Northland Sports Award Fireco Sportswomen of the Year (Nominated)
- 2018 Far North Sports Awards ASB Boxing Code Award (Won)

== Personal life ==
Vaka is of Māori descent, and affiliates to Ngāpuhi.
