= Desley Robinson =

Australian boxer (born 1988)

Personal information
- Nicknames: Destroyer; Lady D
- Born: 23 March 1988 (age 38) Logan City, Queensland, Australia
- Height: 5 ft 10 in (178 cm)
- Weight: Light middleweight; Middleweight; Super middleweight; Light heavyweight

Boxing career
- Reach: 70 in (178 cm)
- Stance: Orthodox

Boxing record
- Total fights: 16
- Wins: 12
- Win by KO: 4
- Losses: 4

Desley Robinson (born 23 March 1988) is an Australian professional boxer. She is a former unified world champion having held the IBF female middleweight title from December 2024 to August 2026 and the WBO title in the same division from April 2025 to August 2026.

== Career ==
Robinson, who took up boxing to improve her fitness, fought Lani Daniels for the vacant IBF female light heavyweight title at McKay Stadium, Whangārei, New Zealand, on 2 December 2023, but lost by majority decision.

Just over a year later, on 13 December 2024, she made her second bid to become a world champion, taking on Kaye Scott for the vacant IBF female middleweight title at The Star Event Centre, Sydney, Australia. Despite fighting on a fractured foot sustained in training camp, Robinson emerged as the winner by unanimous decision.

Robinson became a unified female middleweight world champion when she defended her IBF belt and claimed the vacant WBO title with a unanimous decision win over Chloe Chaos at The Melbourne Pavilion, Kensington, New South Wales, Australia, on 11 April 2025.

She signed with Jake Paul's Most Valuable Promotions in July 2025. Robinson made her first appearance for the promotion and first defense of her unified titles at the Convention Center in South Padre Island, U.S., on 18 October 2025, securing a second round stoppage win over Logan Holler.

Robinson defended her unified IBF and WBO middleweight titles against Mary Spencer at County Coliseum in El Paso, Texas, U.S. on 30 May 2026. She won by unanimous decision.

She made the third defense of her unified titles against Tammara Thibeault at Caribe Royale in Orlando, Florida, U.S. on 8 August 2026. Robinson lost via unanimous decision.

== Professional boxing record ==
16 fights	12 wins	4 losses
By knockout	4	0
By decision	8	4

No.	Result	Record	Opponent	Type	Round, time	Date	Location	Notes
16	Loss	12–4	Tammara Thibeault	UD	10	2026-08-08	Caribe Royale, Orlando, Florida, U.S	Lost IBF and WBO female middleweight titles
15	Win	12–3	Mary Spencer	UD	10	2026-05-30	County Coliseum, El Paso, Texas, U.S	Retained IBF and WBO female middleweight titles
14	Win	11–3	Logan Holler	TKO	2 (10)	2025-10-18	Convention Center, South Padre Island, U.S	Retained IBF and WBO female middleweight titles
13	Win	10–3	Chloe Chaos	UD	10	2025-04-11	The Melbourne Pavilion, Melbourne, Australia	Retained IBF female middleweight title; Won vacant WBO female middleweight title
12	Win	9–3	Kaye Scott	UD	10	2024-12-13	The Star, Sydney, Australia	Won vacant IBF female middleweight title
11	Win	8–3	Mapule Ngubane	UD	10	2024-08-23	The Melbourne Pavilion, Melbourne, Australia	Won vacant IBF female Inter-Continental middleweight title
10	Win	7–3	Suchada Panich	TKO	5 (6), 0:11	2024-07-13	Singmanassak Muaythai School, Pathum Thani, Thailand	
9	Win	6–3	Trish Vaka	TKO	6 (6), 1:11	2024-05-11	Greek Club, Brisbane, Australia	Won vacant ANBF Australasian female super-middleweight title
8	Loss	5–3	Kaye Scott	MD	8	2024-03-23	JBS Basketball Arena, Ipswich, Australia	Lost Australian female middleweight title
7	Loss	5–2	Lani Daniels	MD	10	2023-12-02	McKay Stadium, Whangārei, New Zealand	For inaugural IBF female light-heavyweight title
6	Win	5–1	Nailini Helu	SD	8	2023-08-04	ABA Stadium, Auckland, New Zealand	Won vacant WBA female Oceania middleweight title
5	Win	4–1	Jamie Edenden	UD	8	2023-06-24	Mantra on View Hotel, Gold Coast, Australia	Won vacant Australian female middleweight title
4	Loss	3–1	Millicent Agboegbulem	MD	8	2023-03-25	The Melbourne Pavilion, Melbourne, Australia	For vacant Australian female light-middleweight title
3	Win	3–0	Stephanie Mfongwot	UD	5	2022-09-15	Nissan Arena, Brisbane, Australia	
2	Win	2–0	Trish Vaka	UD	4	2019-10-04	Sky City Convention Centre, Auckland, New Zealand	
1	Win	1–0	Leah Plumpton	TKO	3 (4), 0:43	2019-06-28	Acacia Ridge Hotel, Brisbane, Australia	

== See also ==
- Boxing in Australia
- List of female boxers

Sporting positions
Regional boxing titles
Vacant Title last held by Tayla Harris	Australian middleweight champion June 24, 2023 – March 23, 2024	Succeeded by Kaye Scott
New title	WBA Oceania middleweight champion August 4, 2023 – December 13, 2024; Won world title	Vacant
New title	ANBF Australasian super-middleweight champion May 11, 2024 – December 13, 2024; Won world title	Vacant
New title	IBF Inter-Continental middleweight champion August 23, 2024 – December 13, 2024; Won world title	Vacant
World boxing titles
Vacant Title last held by Claressa Shields	IBF middleweight champion December 13, 2024 – August 8, 2026	Succeeded by Tammara Thibeault
Vacant Title last held by Claressa Shields	WBO middleweight champion April 11, 2025 – August 8, 2026	Succeeded by Tammara Thibeault
