= Sarah Long (fighter) =

New Zealand boxer and kickboxer (born 1987)

- Born: April 27, 1987 (age 39); Te Haroto, New Zealand
- Division: Heavyweight; Light Heavyweight
- Team: S.A.L.T Gym
- Trainer: Terry Tuteru

Professional boxing record
- Total: 7
- Wins: 3
- By knockout: 0
- Losses: 3
- By knockout: 0
- Draws: 1

Other information
- Occupation: Boxer; Kickboxer
- Boxing record from BoxRec

Sarah Long (born 27 April 1987) is a New Zealand professional boxer and kickboxer. She is the current NZPBA New Zealand national heavyweight champion. She has peaked in the world rankings when she ranked 10th in the World Boxing Council and 4th on BoxRec.

== Professional boxing career ==
=== first year 2016 ===
Long made her professional boxing debut against three-time New Zealand amateur national champion Nailini Helu on 18 June 2016. This was the beginning of change in New Zealand regarding women's boxing as this was the fourth women's heavyweight boxing fight in a space of 10 years. After this fight, women's heavyweight boxing fights became more frequent. This was also deemed as a New Zealand heavyweight title fight eliminator, where the winner will go on to fight for the New Zealand title. Long lost the fight by unanimous decision. A few months later Long took on another former New Zealand amateur national champion Cheyenne Whaanga on 24 September 2016. This was Whaanga's only fight of her career. Long lost by unanimous decision. A couple of weeks later, she took on Hamilton boxer Tash Pakai on the show that her trainer Terry Tuteru promoted on 8 October 2016. Long knocked her opponent down in the second round and won by unanimous decision.

=== Win over future world champion & New Zealand title 2017 - 2018 ===
On 10 March 2017, Long took on Geovana Peres. At this time Peres only had one amateur title underneath her, winning the North Island Golden Gloves amateur title the previous year. The fight was close but in the end Long won by unanimous decision. Peres after this fight went on to not only become a 2 time New Zealand national champion but also a WBO Light Heavyweight Champion. Little that was known at the time, this made Long the biggest win of her career and the only person to have beaten Peres in her professional boxing career. On 11 November 2017, Long took on Alrie Meleisea for the NZPBA New Zealand national heavyweight title for one of the biggest New Zealand women's title fights New Zealand has ever seen. It was such a close fight that there was only one fight between them in the final result. Long lost the fight by a close unanimous decision. Long weighed-in in the fight at lightest of her career and actually was weighed in as a Light Heavyweight. The two eventually announced their rematch the following year in June, however, Alrie Meleisea pulled out of the title defence due to her mother dying the previous week before the fight. Alrie vacated her title which gave Longan opportunity to fight for the title against someone else. On 13 October 2018, Long took on Hamilton boxer Ashley Campbell for the vacant NZPBA New Zealand national heavyweight title. Long's boxing skills had improved so much since her debut in 2016, she simply outboxed Ashley, almost winning every single round. Long won the bout by unanimous decision. After the fight, her family erupted into a haka in celebration of her title win.

=== Rematch and World ranking 2019 - Present ===
On 28 September 2019, Long took on her biggest boxing rival, Alrie Meleisea in Alrie first fight in almost 2 years. This was also Long's first fight in almost a year as well. The fight was an entertaining bout but the result ended in a controversial draw. The reason why it was controversial in this 4 round fight was that one judge gave all the rounds to Alrie, one judge gave all the rounds to Long, with the last judge gave the fight an even 38 - 38. Both corners weren't particularly happy with the scoring of the cards. In 2020, Long wasn't able to get a professional boxing fight in New Zealand due to COVID-19 pandemic in New Zealand which resulted in the country getting locked down twice throughout the year. In January 2021, it was announced with World Boxing Council in their January ratings that Long would be ranked 10th in their World Heavyweight women's boxing rankings.

=== Professional boxing titles ===
- New Zealand Professional Boxing Association
  - New Zealand National Heavyweight Title (185¼ Ibs)

=== Professional boxing record ===
| 7 fights | 3 wins | 3 losses |
|---|---|---|
| By knockout | 0 | 0 |
| By decision | 3 | 3 |
| Draws | 1 | |

| No. | Result | Record | Opponent | Type | Round, time | Date | Location | Notes | ref |
|---|---|---|---|---|---|---|---|---|---|
| 7 | Draw | 3–3–1 | (Samoa) (New Zealand) Alrie Meleisea | SD | 4 | 28 Sep 2019 | ABA Stadium, Auckland, New Zealand | | |
| 6 | Win | 3–3 | (New Zealand) Ashley Campbell | UD | 8 | 13 Oct 2018 | 107 Neilson Street Onehunga, Auckland, New Zealand | vacant NZPBA New Zealand national heavyweight title | |
| 5 | Loss | 2–3 | (Samoa) (New Zealand) Alrie Meleisea | UD | 8 | 11 Nov 2017 | ABA Stadium, Auckland, New Zealand | NZPBA New Zealand national heavyweight title | |
| 4 | Win | 2–2 | (Brazil) (New Zealand) Geovana Peres | UD | 4 | 10 Mar 2017 | ABA Stadium, Auckland, New Zealand | | |
| 3 | Win | 1–2 | (New Zealand) Tash Pakai | UD | 4 | 8 Oct 2016 | Manurewa Netball Centre, Manurewa, New Zealand | | |
| 2 | Loss | 0–2 | (New Zealand) Cheyenne Whaanga | UD | 4 | 24 Sep 2016 | ABA Stadium, Auckland, New Zealand | | |
| 1 | Loss | 0–1 | (Tonga) (New Zealand) Nailini Helu | UD | 4 | 18 Jun 2016 | Weymouth Cosmopolitan Club, Auckland, New Zealand | | |

== Kickboxing career ==
=== Kickboxing titles ===
- International Kickboxing Federation
  - New Zealand National Heavyweight Title

== Awards and recognitions ==
- 2019 Gladrap Boxing Awards Female Boxer of the Year (Nominated)
