= Nailini Helu =

New Zealand boxer (born 1993)

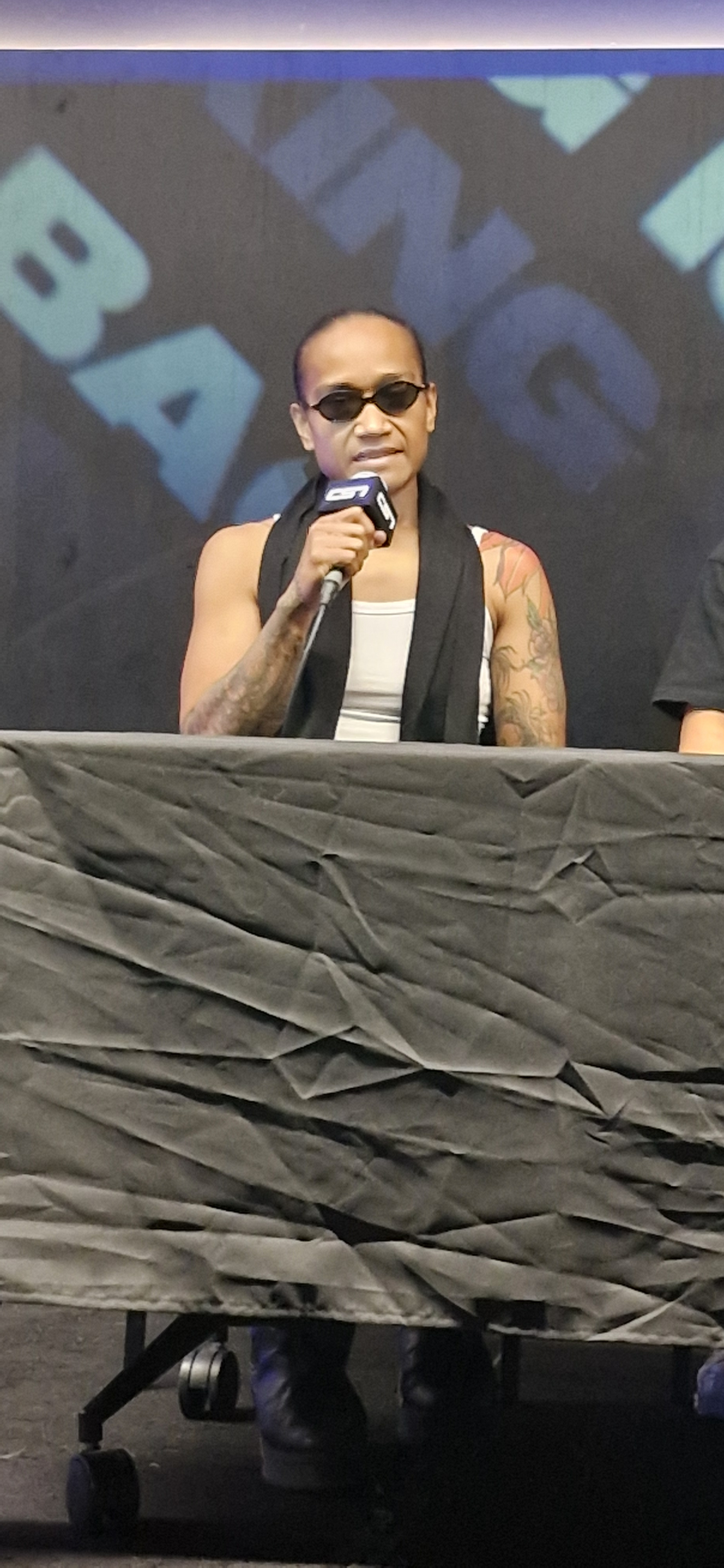
- Nailini Helu at press conference 2026.
- Born: Nailini Inaise Vae Helu; 20 November 1993 (age 32); Nukualofa, Tonga
- Other names: The Tongan Goddess
- Nationality: New Zealander
- Height: 170 cm (5 ft 7 in)
- Weight: 74.7 kg (165 lb; 11 st 11 lb)
- Division: Heavyweight; Light Heavyweight; Super Middleweight; Middleweight
- Style: Boxing
- Stance: Orthodox
- Trainer: Aloisio Helu; Lolo Heimuli
- Rank: 6th
- Years active: 2016-present

Professional boxing record
- Total: 10
- Wins: 4
- By knockout: 0
- Losses: 5
- By knockout: 0
- Draws: 1
- No contests: 0

Other information
- Occupation: Boxer
- Boxing record from BoxRec
- Last updated on: 4 August 2023

Nailini Inaise Vae Helu (born 20 November 1993) is a professional boxer who lives in New Zealand.

Helu has won multiple amateur titles and has peaked a 4th in IBO, 5th on BoxRec in the Super Middleweight rankings and 6th in the IBF Light Heavyweight rankings. She is a two time South Pacific Super Middleweight Champion.

== Professional debut, New Zealand title shot 2016 ==
Helu made her pro boxing debut against Kirsty Lupeamanu for the promotion's own Inaugural Royal Rampage heavyweight title. The title was originally for the super middleweight title, however both boxers failed to make weight, so the title was upgraded to a heavyweight bout despite that the belt itself was pre-engraved for the super middleweight division. Lupeamanu was also originally scheduled to face Michelle Montague; however Montague stepped down due to focusing on amateur MMA fights instead and Helu stepped up. Helu won all rounds of the bout on all judges' scorecards for a dominant win. The bout, which was in 2016, also made history by being the first bout to have New Zealand's first female boxing referee, Shelley Ashton. This fight was on the WBC female middleweight title Kali Reis vs. Maricela Cornejo undercard. Parts of this bout was televised on the TVNZ show Fresh TV. Helu next pro fight was against Sarah Long. Long was making her pro boxing debut, however she has had 6 kickboxing bouts (3 wins 3 losses) and 1 win in Corporate boxing. Helu knocked Long down in the first round for the first first round knock-down in Helu's career. Helu won all rounds, again dominating her opponent. Shortly after the fight, it was announced that this bout was for the mandatory challenging position for the New Zealand (NZPBA version) title.

On 21 July, it was announced that Helu would face Agne Davis for the New Zealand (NZPBA version) & UBF Asia Pacific heavyweight titles on 24 September at ABA Stadium. Ange Davis making her pro boxing debut have fought in 10 kickboxing bouts (5 wins 4 losses 1 draw) and has held the TBANZ Women's middleweight title. The bout was in jeopardy where Davis suffered an ankle injury; however after scans, the doctors were confident that Davis was medically cleared to fight. Helu was favored to win the bout and was likely to receive a world title shot within the next year if she kept up her winning streak. The bout itself was close throughout the fight; however the fight of the night ended by a split decision win to Helu. After the bout, there was a massive backlash all across social media with people thinking Davis won the bout. The backlash got so bad that people were sending abuse to Helu, the promoter, and even to the judges themselves. On 26 September, Ange Davis and her team launched an appeal with NZPBA, due to poor judging. On 6 October, NZPBA announced that the panel looked into the scorecards of the judges and found that one of the judges incorrectly added up their card. They originally were 58/56 in favour of Helu, however when calculating the card it was indeed supposed to be 57/57, a draw, making this decision a split decision draw. The judge that made this error was stood down and regulations on all NZ title bouts have been changed. The decision of the bout was overturned to a draw, Helu had two belts to be stripped and the two were required to have a rematch with 6 months of their bout (expiring 24 March 2017) or face risk of losing their mandatory positions. On 26 December, Māori Television televised this fight on the combat show called Whawhai Fight Night. Helu was originally scheduled to fight Victoria Nansen on 8 October 2016. However, due to the backlash after the Helu vs Davis bout, there was a big toll on Helu's mental health and she was unable to take part in the bout let alone train. Kirsty Lupeamanu took on the fight on a week's notice and won by majority decision.

Helu was originally scheduled to take on Cheyenne Whaanga for the New Zealand (NZPBA version) light heavyweight Title; however due to Whaanga receiving an injury during training, Meleisea was not able to take part. Alrie Meleisea took the fight on less than a week notice. Meleisea won the bout by a massive upset split decision.

== Losing streak to the best 2017-2018 ==
In January 2017, it was announced that Helu would have a rematch against Alrie Meleisea in March 2017 at ABA Stadium for the vacant NZPBA and UBF Asia Pacific heavyweight titles. Planning the bout was difficult for the promoter, due to the rematch clause in the Helu vs Ange Davis appeal. During training, Davis suffered a serious shoulder injury that would bring her away from the ring passed the 6 month expiry rematch clause day of 24 March. Due to this, Helu and Meleisea were allowed to fight for the vacant titles, with the winner to face Davis when she was fully healed. Helu lost the bout by a controversial split decision. Helu faced Brazil born Geovana Peres at ABA Stadium on 21 April for the NZNBF version of the New Zealand National Title. This will Helu's third New Zealand title shot of her career. Peres won the bout by unanimous decision with all three judges scoring 79-73 and becoming the first ever LGBT person to hold a New Zealand Professional Boxing Title. After being away from the ring for 64 weeks, Nailini Helu returned to professional boxing against Lani Daniels on 14 July 2018 at Auckland Netball Centre in St Johns, Auckland, New Zealand. It was announced on 6 June that the bout between the two will happen with Lani Daniels New Zealand National (NZPBA Version) Light Heavyweight title will be on the line. The two have fought before back in the amateurs multiple times. Daniels won the bout by unanimous decision.

== Comeback 2022 - 2024 ==
On 26 August 2022, Helu made her return to the ring after being away from the ring for four years. Helu took on Amateur New Zealand champion Tinta Smith for the PBCNZ South Pacific Super Middleweight title. In August 2023, Helu took on Desley Robinson for the WBA Oceania Middleweight title. It was a close fight with Robinson winning by split decision. Helu won the fight by majority decision, making this her first official title in her career. She would reclaim the title in a rematch with Helu winning in August 2024 by Split Decision. As a result, she would receive her first world rankings, being ranked 6th in the IBF in the Light Heavyweight division.

== Personal life ==
Helu trains at Pridelands boxing gym, which is based in Ōtara. The gym is a community-based gym that is free for everyone to use. Helu's uncle, Aloisio Helu, once ran the gym, but died in 2024. Helu is the older sister to Light Heavyweight boxer Panuve Helu, which is common for them to spar and train together. Panuve Helu started training with City Kickboxing and Nailini Helu started train back with her first trainer at Balmoral Lee Gar Gym.

== Amateur boxing titles ==
- Gold 2015 New Zealand Golden Gloves Championship Heavyweight
- Gold 2015 New Zealand National Championship Heavyweight
- Gold 2014 New Zealand National Championship Heavyweight
- Silver 2014 New Zealand North Island Golden Gloves Championship Heavyweight
- Bronze 2013 New Zealand National Championship Light Heavyweight
- Silver New Zealand North Island Golden Gloves Championship Heavyweight
- Gold 2012 New Zealand National Championship Light Heavyweight

== Professional boxing titles ==
- Boxing Promotions titles
  - Royal Rampage Heavyweight Title (172¾Ibs)
- New Zealand Professional Boxing Commission
  - South Pacific Super Middleweight title (164Ibs)
  - South Pacific Super Middleweight title (161½Ibs)

== Professional boxing record ==
10 fights	4 wins	5 losses
By knockout	0	0
By decision	4	5
Draws	1	

No.	Result	Record	Opponent	Type	Round, time	Date	Location	Notes
10	Win	4–5–1	(New Zealand) Tinta Smith	SD	8	17 August 2024	Te Rapa Racecourse, Hamilton, New Zealand	Won vacant PBCNZ South Pacific super middleweight title
9	Loss	3–5–1	(Australia) Desley Robinson	MD	8	4 August 2023	ABA Stadium, Auckland, New Zealand	Lost Vacant WBA Oceania middleweight title
8	Win	3–4–1	(New Zealand) Tinta Smith	MD	8	26 August 2022	ABA Stadium, Auckland, New Zealand	Won vacant South Pacific (PBCNZ Version) super middleweight title
7	Lose	2–4–1	(New Zealand) Lani Daniels	UD	8	14 July 2018	Auckland Netball Centre, St John, Auckland, New Zealand	For New Zealand (NZPBA Version) light heavyweight title
6	Lose	2–3–1	(Brazil) (New Zealand) Geovana Peres	UD	8	21 April 2017	ABA Stadium, Auckland, New Zealand	For vacant New Zealand (NZNBF Version) light heavyweight title
5	Lose	2–2–1	(New Zealand) Alrie Meleisea	SD	6	10 March 2017	ABA Stadium, Auckland, New Zealand	For vacant New Zealand (NZPBA Version) and UBF Asia Pacific heavyweight titles
4	Lose	2–1–1	(New Zealand) Alrie Meleisea	SD	3	28 October 2016	ASB Stadium, Auckland, New Zealand	
3	Draw	2–0–1	(New Zealand) Ange Davis	SD	6	24 September 2016	ABA Stadium, Auckland, New Zealand	For vacant New Zealand (NZPBA Version) and UBF Asia Pacific heavyweight titles Original result went to Helu by SD, however due to an appeal the result was changed to a draw
2	Win	2–0	(New Zealand) Sarah Long	UD	4	18 June 2016	Weymouth Cosmopolitan Club, Manukau, New Zealand	
1	Win	1–0	(New Zealand) Kirsty Lupeamanu	UD	4	16 April 2016	The Trusts Arena, Auckland, New Zealand	Won inaugural Royal Rampage heavyweight title
