= Sequita Hemingway =

New Zealand Maori boxer (born 1982)

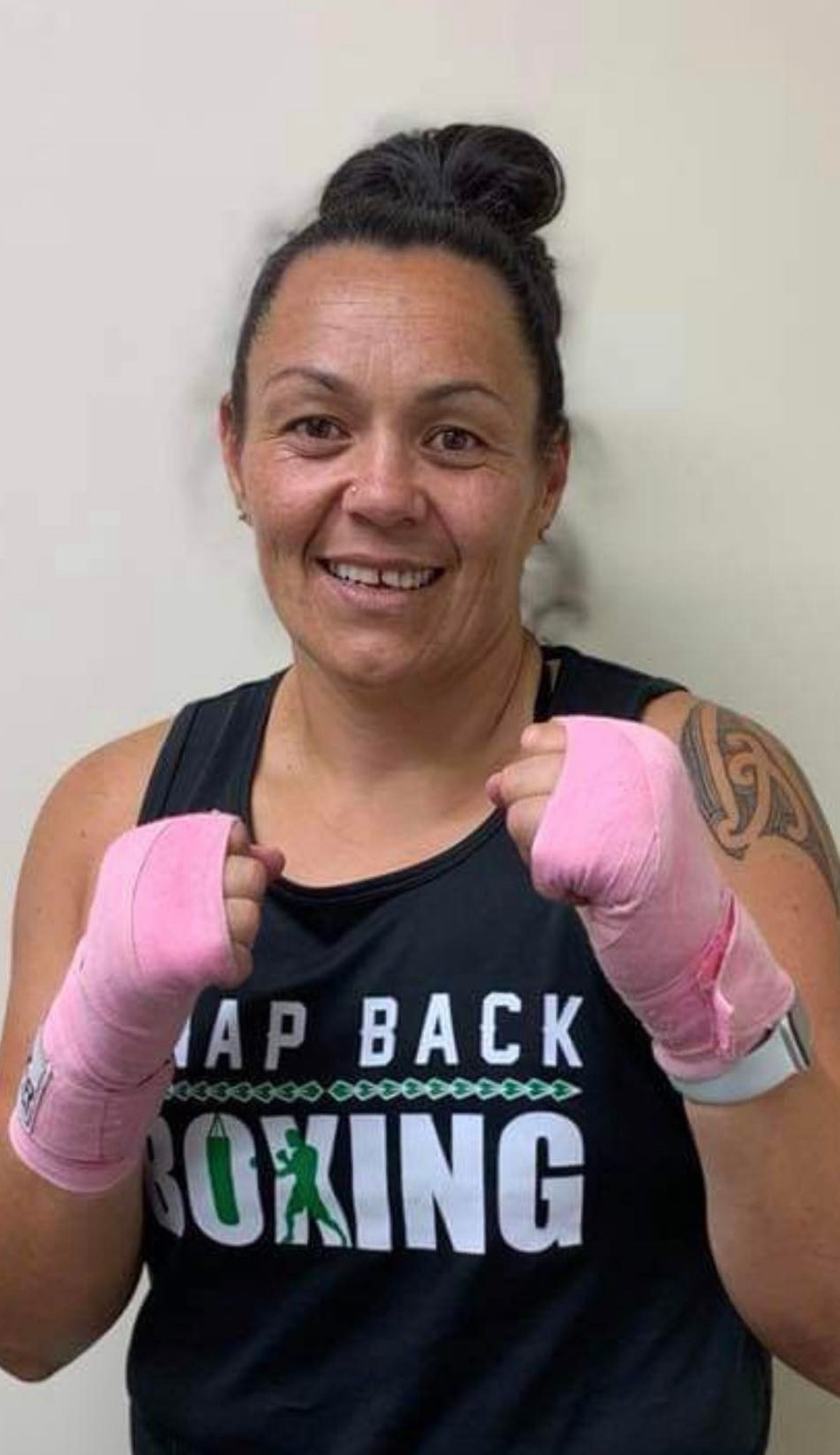

Personal information
- Born: January 7, 1982 (age 44) Waikaremoana, New Zealand
- Height: 180 cm (5 ft 11 in)
- Weight: Heavyweight

Boxing career
- Reach: 180 cm (71 in)

Boxing record
- Total fights: 10
- Wins: 4
- Win by KO: 0
- Losses: 6

Sequita Hemingway (born 7 January 1982) is a New Zealand professional boxer, rugby league and rugby union player. She is of Māori descent and identifies as a member of the Ngāti Tūwharetoa and Ngāi Tūhoe iwi. She is the second female to become a two time heavyweight New Zealand national boxing champion.

Hemingway peaked in the world rankings when she reached third in the WBA, sixth in the WBC, first in the IBO, and fourth on BoxRec.

== Professional boxing career ==
=== Debut against World Ranked boxer 2021 ===
Filipo Saua out of Snap Back Boxing is Hemingways trainer since making her professional debut. Hemingway made her professional debut against world ranked boxer Alrie Meleisea. Before making her professional debut, she had only a few corporate fights with no amateur experience. Hemingway won the fight by majority decision which was considered a massive upset. After the fight, it was reported that Hemingway was in line for a New Zealand title. On July 23, 2021, it was announced that Hemingway would compete at New Zealand's largest rugby stadium, Eden Park. Due to the COVID-19 pandemic the event was postponed to 29 April 2022 and ended up being held at ABA Stadium.

=== Lani Daniels 2022 ===
Hemingway took on former world title challenger Lani Daniels. She suffered her first loss against Daniels, losing by unanimous decision. Hemingway was originally scheduled to fight Daniels again in a rematch for a New Zealand title, however, due to injury Hemingway had to pull out of the fight. In July 2022, Hemingway received her first major world ranking where she was ranked 6th with the WBA in the Light Heavyweight division, which is WBA's version of the Heavyweight division.

=== Double Rematches 2022 - 2023 ===
In October 2022, it was announced that a rematch would happen between Meleisea and Hemingway in December for the vacant Pro Box NZ New Zealand National heavyweight title. At this time Hemingway is ranked 3rd in the WBA. The winner of the Meleisea vs Hemingway fight would potentially lead to either a world title fight or at least a world title eliminator. Leading into the fight, Hemingway had a 12 week training camp to prepare for her fight against Meleisea. Meleisea won the fight by unanimous decision, making her a two time New Zealand heavyweight champion. Hemingway stated she be interest in either a rematch with Meleisea or a fight against Nailini Helu. In January 2023, it was announced that negotiations were happening to have a rematch with Lani Daniels. On 14 January, the fight was confirmed and will be for the ANBF Australasian Heavyweight title. On March 10, Daniels won the fight against Hemingway by unanimous decision, winning the ANBF Australasian Heavyweight title.

== Boxing titles ==
- Pro Box NZ
  - New Zealand National Heavyweight title
- New Zealand National Boxing Federation
  - New Zealand National Heavyweight title

== Professional boxing records ==
10 fights	4 wins	6 losses
By decision	4	6

No.	Result	Record	Opponent	Type	Round, time	Date	Location	Notes
10	Win	4–6	Maria Hunt	UD	8	13 Dec 2024	TET MultiSports Centre, Stratford, New Zealand	Defended New Zealand national (Pro Box NZ version) Heavyweight title
9	Win	3–6	Cheyenne Whaanga	MD	6	5 Sep 2024	ABA Stadium, Auckland, New Zealand	Won vacant New Zealand national (NZNBF version) Heavyweight title
8	Loss	2–6	Tinta Smith	SD	8	11 May 2024	Te Rapa Racecourse, Hamilton, New Zealand	Lost vacant New Zealand national (PBCNZ version) Cruiserweight title
7	Loss	2–5	Che Kenneally	UD	8	23 Mar 2024	JBS Basketball Arena, Ipswich, Queensland, Australia	Lost ANBF Australasian Heavyweight title
6	Loss	2–4	Che Kenneally	SD	6	14 Oct 2023	Gold Coast Recreation Precinct, Palm Beach, Queensland, Australia	Lost vacant ANBF Australasian Heavyweight title
5	Win	2–3	Maria Hunt	UD	8	19 Aug 2023	Awapuni Rcecource Function Room, Awapuni, New Zealand	Won vacant New Zealand National (Pro Box NZ version) Heavyweight title
4	Loss	1–3	Lani Daniels	UD	8	10 Mar 2023	ABA Stadium, Auckland, New Zealand	vacant ANBF Australasian Heavyweight title
3	Loss	1–2	Alrie Meleisea	UD	8	9 Dec 2022	Eventfinda Stadium, Auckland, New Zealand	vacant New Zealand national (Pro Box NZ version) Heavyweight title
2	Loss	1–1	Lani Daniels	UD	6	30 Apr 2022	ABA Stadium, Auckland, New Zealand	
1	Win	1–0	Alrie Meleisea	MD	4	10 Jul 2021	The Plaza, Putāruru, New Zealand	

== Rugby career ==
Sequita Hemingway
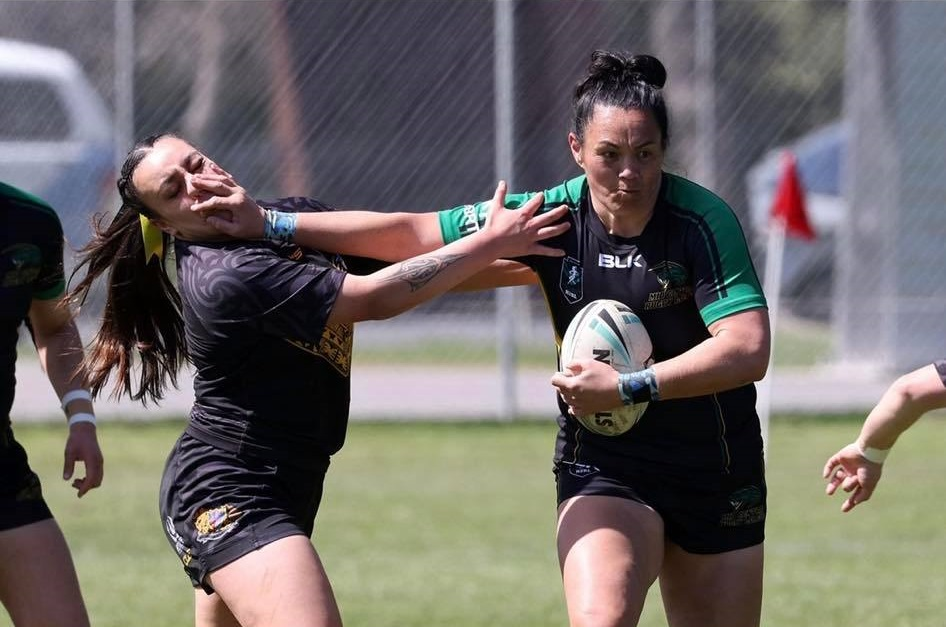

Personal information
- Born: 7 January 1982 (age 44) Waikaremoana, New Zealand
- Height: 1.80 m (5 ft 11 in)
- Weight: 85 kg (187 lb; 13 st 5 lb)

Playing information
- Position: Prob
Club
Years	Team	Pld	T	G	FG	P
2013–2015	Linton Cobras					5
2016–2020	Mid Central Vipers	6				0
	Total	6	0	0	0	5

Rugby union career
- Position(s): Prop, Forward
Senior career
Years	Team	Apps	(Points)
2015–2022	Kia Toa Rugby club	25	
2017–2019	Manawatu Rugby Union	16	(0)

=== Rugby league ===
Hemingway made her rugby league debut with Linton Cobras in Wellington. In this time, her team won the Wellington regional title twice in a row. She joined the Mid Central Vipers in 2016.

=== Rugby union ===
Before she made her debut with Farah Palmer Cup team Manawatu Cyclones, she came from the local rugby club Kia Toa RFC. Hemingway made the selections for Manawatu Cyclones for the 2017, 2018, and 2019 seasons.

== Personal life ==
Hemingway is of Māori descent, and affiliates to Ngāti Tūwharetoa and Ngāi Tūhoe.

== Awards ==
- New Zealand Boxing Awards
  - Upset of the year (Won)
  - Debut of the year (Won)
  - Female Newcomer of the year (Won)
  - Rugby Boxer of the year (Won)
