= Geovana Peres vs. Claire Hafner =

Geovana Peres vs Claire Hafner
- Date: 4 October 2019
- Venue: SkyCity Convention Centre, Auckland, New Zealand
- Title(s) on the line: WBO Light Heavyweight Championship vacant LBC Lineal Heavyweight Championship

Tale of the tape
Boxer	(New Zealand) (Brazil) Geovana Peres	(Canada) (United States) Claire Hafner
Nickname	The Shield Maiden	
Hometown	Auckland, New Zealand	Ottawa, Ontario, Canada
Pre-fight record	7–1	4–1
Height	5 ft 6 in (1.68 m)	5 ft 4 in (1.63 m)
Weight	78.2 kg (172 lb)	78.1 kg (172 lb)
Style	Orthodox	Orthodox
Recognition	WBO World Women's Light Heavyweight Champion & Boxrec No. 2 Ranked Heavyweight	WBC No. 4 Ranked Heavyweight & Boxrec No. 1 Ranked Heavyweight; ABO American female heavyweight champion

Result
- Peres wins via 8-round Referee Stoppage

Geovana Peres vs Claire Hafner was a world title fight that took place on 4 October 2019 at SkyCity Convention Centre in Auckland, New Zealand. Peres won the fight by referee stoppage between the 8th and 9th round. This was considered a history making moment as Geovana Peres was the first New Zealand female boxer to win and successfully defend a world title in her home country. Geovana Peres was also the first LGBT person representing New Zealand to hold a world boxing title. Claire Hafner was born in the USA but considers herself a Canadian. She came into the fight ranked first on Boxrec, above Geovana who was ranked second. The winner of the fight would also be recognized as the official Lineal World Heavyweight champion.

== History ==
=== Background ===
Geovana Peres won her WBO World Light Heavyweight title on 30 March against Lani Daniels, which was dubbed "history in the making". Peres won the fight by unanimous decision. Claire Hafner won her first boxing title fight on 29 September 2018 against former world number one Sonja Fox, winning the ABO American female heavyweight title. Claire reached the top ranking after she defeated former WBC world title contender Carlette Ewell on June 15, 2019. Claire Hafner dropped down in weight for the fight against Peres, losing 9 kg.

On 5 May 2019, Bruce Glozier announced that he was in negotiations for Geovana Peres' first world title defence with Claire Hafner. Shortly after, it was announced that Steve Deane had joined Bruce Glozier to form a new company called Rival Sports Promotion. At this time they signed a three-fight deal with both Geovana Peres and Lani Daniels. On 31 July, it was announced that the fight between Peres and Hafner was official. To promote the fight Peres set a record by doing boxing pad training on top of the Auckland Sky Tower 193 metres in the air.

Leading up to the event it was noted that no fights or training material from Claire Hafner were available on the internet. For this reason Peres had to literally train for everything, as they did not know what to expect. Peres had some fight footage online which gave Hafner material to study and train with. A few days before the fight, the two boxers met each other for the first time at a media and photo shoot at Cheltenham Beach. Hafner told the media that her opponent was exactly what she had expected and that she was very confident leading into the fight.

== Fight Card ==
Weight Class	Weight		vs.		Method	Round	Time	Notes
Light Heavyweight	175 lbs.	(New Zealand) (Brazil) Geovana Peres	def.	(Canada) (United States) Claire Hafner	TKO	8/10	2:00	^{Note 1}
Middleweight	160 lbs.	(New Zealand) Lani Daniels	drew.	(New Zealand) Tessa Tualevao	SD	8/8	2:00	^{Note 2}
Heavyweight	200+ lbs.	(Australia) (Samoa) Herman Ene-Purcell	def.	(New Zealand) (Samoa) Viliamu Motusaga	UD	5/5	3:00
Middleweight	160 lbs.	(Australia) Desley Robinson	def.	(New Zealand) Trish Vaka	UD	4/4	2:00
Welterweight	147 lbs.	(New Zealand) Gentiane Lupi	def.	(New Zealand) Karen Te Ruki Pasene	SD	4/4	2:00

^Note 1 For WBO Light Heavyweight title & vacant LBC Lineal Heavyweight title
^Note 2 For vacant New Zealand (PBCNZ version) Middleweight title

== Fight details ==
Geovana Peres vs Claire Hafner was held at SkyCity Convention Centre in Auckland, New Zealand. Tickets for the fight went on sale on 31 July 2019 after Bruce Glozier announced that general admission and corporate tables tickets would start at $65. Rival Sports Promotion elected to distribute the tickets themselves through the event Facebook page and their website. They sold out the event with a little over 1000 tickets between general admission and corporate tables.

The fight announcer was Daniel Hennessey. Singapore born Australian Phil Austin served as the in-ring referee and New Zealanders Arden Fatu and Ioana Schwalger, along with Australian Chris Condon, were the ringside judges. Danny Leigh served as the supervisor and representative for the WBO.

Before the event began, the national anthems of Canada and New Zealand were sung. Claire Hafner sang the Canadian national anthem before her fight.

=== Broadcasting ===
It was announced that the event would be televised through Sky Sports on Sky TV, with a live broadcast. It was also announced that Samoa would broadcast the fight live on Samoa TV3.

International broadcasters
Country	Broadcaster
New Zealand	Sky Sports 3
Samoa	TV 3

=== Weigh in ===
On 3 October 2019 the weigh in was held at Skycity Auckland at Sammy's, which is located on the gaming floor in the casino.

== Recap ==
=== Aftermath ===
After the fight Geovana Peres was interviewed in the ring. "It feels dream-like. This is for us New Zealand... I'm proud to be a Kiwi now. This is ours and it will stay here... The only thing that was missing was a TKO and I have it now. I'm going to get better... I don't know what will happen next. That's for my manager now. Back to training and set some goals for next year." On 26 January 2021, it was announced that Geovana Peres had officially retired from boxing, ending her career as a world champion. On the 16 April 2021, Geovana Peres made her amateur muay thai fight debut against IFMA Junior Gold Medalist and GAMMA World Champion Roezala Su’e. On 13 August, Peres won her first kickboxing fight against Gina Gee. Peres won the fight by unanimous decision with her winning the inaugural Fau Vake Warrior's Heart Memorial Shield.
