= Danielle Perkins =

American boxer (born 1982)

Personal information
- Nickname: New Era
- Born: August 30, 1982 (age 43) Brooklyn, New York, U.S.
- Height: 6 ft 0 in (183 cm)
- Weight: Light heavyweight; Heavyweight

Boxing career
- Reach: 72 in (183 cm)
- Stance: Southpaw

Boxing record
- Total fights: 7
- Wins: 6
- Win by KO: 3
- Losses: 1
Medal record
Women's Amateur boxing
Representing United States
World Championships
Bronze medal – third place	2018 New Delhi	Heavyweight
Gold medal – first place	2019 Ulan-Ude	Heavyweight

Danielle Perkins (born August 30, 1982) is an American professional boxer, who has held the WBA female light-heavyweight title since February 2026. As an amateur she won a bronze medal at the 2018 World Championships and gold the following year.

== Professional boxing career ==
=== Perkins vs. Harrison ===
Perkins made her professional debut on August 20, 2020, scoring a four-round unanimous decision (UD) victory against Monika Harrison at the Kronk Gym in Detroit, Michigan.

=== Perkins vs. Harrison 2 ===
In her third professional fight, Perkins faced Monika Harrison in a rematch of her pro-debut at Dort Financial Center in Flint, Michigan, on March 5, 2021, with the vacant WBC Silver female heavyweight title on the line. She won the eight-round contest by unanimous decision.

=== Perkins vs. Shields ===
On February 2, 2025, Claressa Shields faced Perkins for the undisputed female heavyweight championship at Dort Financial Center in Flint, Michigan. Shields scored the fight's lone knockdown in the waning seconds of the tenth round and won the bout by unanimous decision with the judges' scorecards reading 97-92, 99-90, and 100-89- all for Shields. Thanks to the victory, she became the only three-division undisputed champion, male or female, of the four-belt era, as well as the first female undisputed heavyweight champion ever.

=== Perkins vs. Kenneally ===
Perkins challenged WBA female light-heavyweight female champion Che Kenneally at Little Caesars Arena in Detroit, Michigan, on February 22, 2026. She knocked her opponent to the canvas in the sixth round and, although Kenneally got back to her feet, the referee decided she was not fit to continue and called a halt to the bout, awarding Perkins the win by technical knockout.

== Professional boxing record ==
7 fights	6 wins	1 loss
By knockout	3	0
By decision	3	1

No.	Result	Record	Opponent	Type	Round, time	Date	Location	Notes
7	Win	6–1	Che Kenneally	TKO	6 (10), 1:45	Feb 22, 2026	Little Caesars Arena, Detroit, Michigan, U.S.	Won WBA female light-heavyweight title
6	Loss	5–1	Claressa Shields	UD	10	Feb 2, 2025	Dort Financial Center, Flint, Michigan, U.S.	For WBC, WBF, vacant IBF, inaugural WBA and WBO female heavyweight titles
5	Win	5–0	Christianne Fahey	UD	6	Jul 27, 2024	Little Caesars Arena, Detroit, Michigan, U.S.	
4	Win	4–0	Timea Nagy	TKO	2 (6), 1:42	Mar 1, 2024	County Coliseum, El Paso, Texas, U.S.	
3	Win	3–0	Monika Harrison	UD	8	Mar 5, 2021	Dort Financial Center, Flint, Michigan, U.S.	Won vacant WBC Silver female heavyweight title
2	Win	2–0	Princess Hairston	KO	5 (6), 1:41	Dec 3, 2020	Wild Card Boxing, Los Angeles, California, U.S.	
1	Win	1–0	Monika Harrison	UD	4	Aug 20, 2020	Kronk Gym, Detroit, Michigan, U.S.	

== See also ==
- List of female boxers
- List of southpaw stance boxers

Sporting positions
Regional boxing titles
New title	WBC Silver heavyweight champion March 5, 2021 – 2021; Vacated	Vacant
World boxing titles
Preceded by Che Kenneally	WBA light-heavyweight title February 22, 2026 – present	Incumbent
