= Che Kenneally =

Australian boxer (born 1995)

Personal information
- Nationality: Australian
- Born: Chei Aleta Kenneally; 2 February 1995 (age 31) Sydney, New South Wales, Australia
- Height: 183 cm (6 ft 0 in)
- Weight: Heavyweight; Light heavyweight

Boxing career
- Reach: 185 cm (73 in)
- Stance: Orthodox

Boxing record
- Total fights: 6
- Wins: 5
- Win by KO: 2
- Losses: 1

Chei Aleta Kenneally (born 2 February 1995) is an Australian professional boxer. She held the WBA female light heavyweight title from July 2024 to February 2026.

== Early life ==
Kenneally was born in Sydney, Australia and relocated to the Gold Coast in her younger years. Her first sporting interest was athletics, which was rewarded when she was selected to represent Queensland at the 2005 Pacific School Games in under-10s shot put competition and went on to compete in multiple Australian national athletics championships in the disciplines of shot put, discus and hammer throw.

Kenneally began boxing at the age of 15 when she joined the Albert Boxing Club on the Gold Coast and trained alongside future world champions Skye Nicolson and Cherneka Johnson. She has also competed in modelling competitions and was chosen to be Miss Teen Oceania at the 2014 World Supermodel Pageant.

A single mother, she trains on the Gold Coast in Burleigh Heads.

== Professional career ==
Kenneally made her professional debut on 18 March 2023, where she defeated Rhianna Arnold in a four-round bout by technical knockout (TKO) at the Geelong Arena in Geelong, Victoria.

Kenneally then faced Kate Langenhorst for the vacant ANBF Australasian Women's light heavyweight title on 24 June 2023. After six rounds, she won the bout by majority decision to win the title.

Kenneally faced Sequita Hemingway for the vacant ANBF Australasian Women's heavyweight title on 14 October 2023. She won the bout by split decision to win the title. She also defended her title against Hemingway on 23 March 2024.

In her fifth bout, Kenneally faced Angie Paola Rocha for the vacant WBA female light heavyweight title on 20 July 2024. She won the bout by TKO in the third round to win the vacant title in her hometown of the Gold Coast.

Kenneally signed a contract with Salita Promotions in April 2025.

She defended her WBA female light heavyweight title for the first time against Danielle Perkins at Little Caesars Arena in Detroit, Michigan, USA, on 22 February 2026. Kenneally was knocked to the canvas in the sixth round and, although she got back to her feet, the referee decided she was not fit to continue and called a halt to the bout, awarding Perkins the win by technical knockout.

== Professional boxing record ==
6 fights	5 wins	1 loss
By knockout	2	1
By decision	3	0

No.	Result	Record	Opponent	Type	Round, time	Date	Location	Notes
6	Loss	5–1	Danielle Perkins	TKO	6 (10), 1:45	22 Feb 2026	Little Caesars Arena, Detroit, Michigan, USA	Lost WBA female light heavyweight title
5	Win	5–0	Angie Paola Rocha	TKO	3 (10), 2:00	20 Jul 2024	Southport Sharks AFL Club, Gold Coast, Queensland, Australia	Won vacant WBA female light heavyweight title
4	Win	4–0	Sequita Hemingway	UD	8	23 Mar 2024	JBS Basketball Arena, Ipswich, Queensland, Australia	Retained ANBF Australasian Women's heavyweight title
3	Win	3–0	Sequita Hemingway	SD	6	14 Oct 2023	Gold Coast Recreation Precinct, Gold Coast, Queensland, Australia	Won vacant ANBF Australasian Women's heavyweight title
2	Win	2–0	Kate Langenhorst	MD	6	24 Jun 2023	Mantra on View Hotel, Gold Coast, Queensland, Australia	Won vacant ANBF Australasian Women's light heavyweight title
1	Win	1–0	Rhianna Arnold	TKO	4 (4)	18 Mar 2023	Geelong Arena, Geelong, Victoria, Australia	

== See also ==
- List of female boxers
