= Geovana Peres =

New Zealand boxer (born 1977)

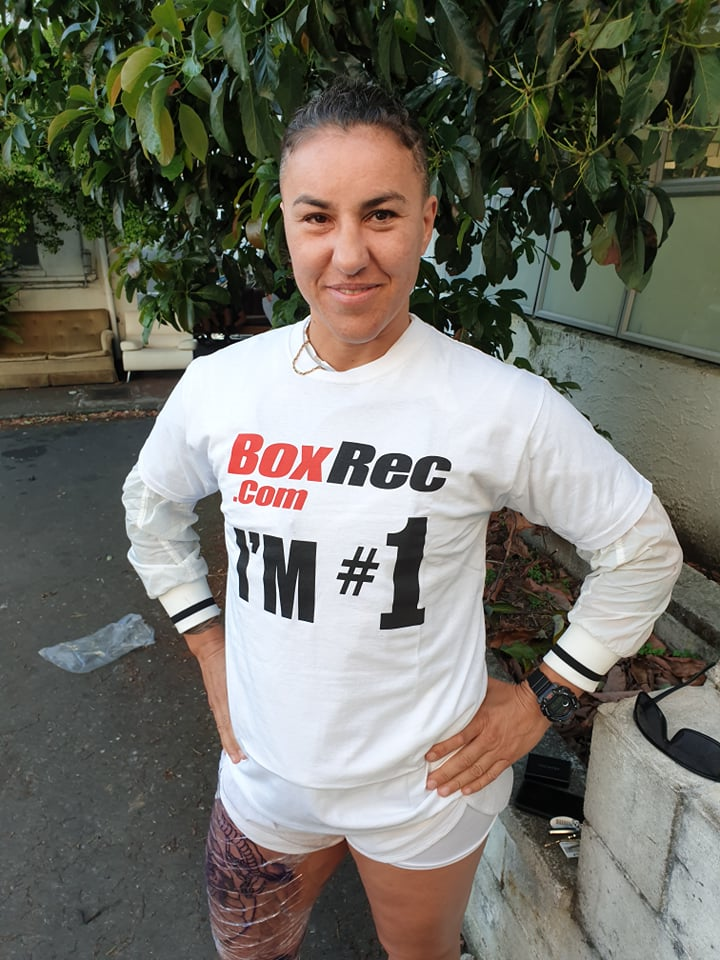
- Born: Geovana De Cassia Peres; 8 February 1977 (age 49); Bueno Brandão, Minas Gerais, Brazil
- Nationality: Brazil; New Zealand
- Height: 168 cm (5 ft 6 in)
- Weight: 78.7 kg (174 lb; 12 st 6 lb)
- Division: Light Heavyweight (Boxing); Heavyweight (Muay Thai/Kickboxing)
- Reach: 169 cm (66.5 in)
- Style: Boxing; Muay Thai; Kickboxing
- Team: Mayhem Boxing Team; City Lee Gar
- Trainer: Terry Reid-Batchelor (Boxing); Tony Angelov (Muay Thai/Kickboxing); Steve Hahm (Muay Thai/Kickboxing)
- Years active: Amateur & Corporate Boxing 2015 - 2016; Professional Boxing 2017 - 2019; Kickboxing and Muay Thai fighter 2021 - Present

Professional boxing record
- Total: 9
- Wins: 8
- By knockout: 1
- Losses: 1
- By knockout: 0
- Draws: 0

Kickboxing record
- Total: 4
- Wins: 3
- By knockout: 0
- Losses: 1
- By knockout: 0
- Draws: 0

Amateur record
- Total: 3
- Wins: 3
- By knockout: 0
- Losses: 0
- By knockout: 0
- Draws: 0

Other information
- Occupation: Boxer; Kickboxing and Muay Thai Fighter
- University: Auckland University
- Boxing record from BoxRec

Geovana De Cassia Peres (born 8 February 1977) is a Brazilian-born New Zealand professional Muay Thai fighter and former professional boxer who competed from 2017 to 2019. She became the first female light-heavyweight world champion, having held the WBO female title from 2019 until her retirement in January 2021.

== Corporate and amateur boxing ==
When she was 38 years old, Geovana Peres began her boxing career at a corporate level, where she took on Teuila Laika on a charity fundraiser event for Canteen New Zealand. This was Teuila Laika third corporate boxing fight which gave her experience. Geovana won her first bout by unanimous decision, winning every round. Peres went on to win Golden Gloves title and another win in the corporate division before turning pro.

== Professional boxing career ==
In March 2017, Geovana Peres made her professional debut against veteran kickboxer Sarah Long. Long who had five wins and four losses in kick boxing, did not start off very well in professional boxing. Long was defeated by Nailini Helu and Cheyenne Whaanga, both who were once top 10 boxers. Sarah Long made a come back by defeating Tash Pakai. It was a close fight between Geovana Peres and Sarah Long, however Long experience gave her the advantage helping her take home the win by Unanimous decision. Long went on to reaching top 10 in the world then challenger for the NZPBA Heavyweight title, but for Geovana Peres it was back to the drawing board.

In March 2017, it was announced that Geovana Peres will take on former top 10 in the world boxing Nailini Helu for the vacant NZNBF New Zealand light heavyweight title. Helu climbed the ranks quickly in 2016, reaching 8th in the heavyweight world. But after a decision that was reversed to a draw in September 2016 and receiving a massive backlash from boxing fans, Helu went down hill. Nailini Helu went up against Alrie Meleisea twice but lost by split decision. Helu received another New Zealand title chance but this time against Geovana Peres. Peres was coming off a professional loss herself, so she had to come back with something to prove. Geovana Peres won the bout by Unanimous decision, winning 7 out of 8 rounds of the fight. This made her the first person that is Brazilian and first LGBT person to win a New Zealand Professional boxing title.

In July 2017, Geovana Peres took on Tessa Tualevao. Tualevao at the time was only 18, however despite her very young age she had a big kickboxing experience. Geovana came in as a keep busy fight and showed her experience and skill against Tessa. Peres was too much for Tualevao as Peres knocked her down in the second round. Peres won the bout by Unanimous Decision.

After her warm up fight, it was announced that Geovana Peres will be going for her second New Zealand title, taking on Trish Vaka for the PBCNZ New Zealand light heavyweight title. Peres admitted that she didn't know much about Trish Vaka, as there wasn't much video material online to watch her at the time. Peres stated that she was very focused for this fight and wanted this title. The fight was a close fight, however Geovana Peres came away with the victory and not only winning another New Zealand title, but becoming first women to win two different New Zealand titles.

In December 2017, Geovana Peres took on Tessa Tualevao in a rematch. Peres underestimated Tualevao in the first round which gave Tessa winning the round. The second round was close however Geovana proceeded to win the rest of the bout. Peres won the bout by Unanimous Decision. After the bout, in an interview with Benjamin Thomas Watt she stated "I always feel great after a win, but you know you can't underestimate you opponent and Tessa is very talented and tough girl".

In March 2018, Geovana Peres defended her PBCNZ New Zealand title against Lani Daniels in their first 10-round fight. Lani Daniel's is well known for being a multiple New Zealand Amateur champion. She has a big amateur boxing background alongside her sister Caroline Daniels. The bout against was extremely close and Peres almost was knocked down in the ninth round. Peres won the bout by a very close Split Decision. After the bout, manager of Lani Daniel's stated they are wanting to have a rematch with Peres as soon as possible.

After Peres bout against Daniels, an announcement was made that big talks were in progress for a future world title bout. The plan was stated that Lani Daniels will take on Nailini Helu sometime in July or August. The winner of that bout will take on Geovana Peres in February 2019 for some sort of regional title in one of the major four sanctioning bodies. The winner between Geovana Peres and Lani Daniels or Nailini Helu will take on Alrie Meleisea for a World title. That world title bout will either take place late in 2019 or early 2020. After the announcement of future world title plans, Geovana Peres received her first World ranking from a major boxing sanctioning body. It was announced in early April 2018, that Peres is ranked fifth in the World Boxing Association Heavyweight female rankings. In July 2018, Lani Daniels defeated Nailini Helu by Unanimous decision. Lani then defeated Tessa Tualevao in September 2018. In mid 2018, Geovana rankings jumped to first in WBA and second on Boxrec. Lani Daniels was also ranked tenth in the WBA and eighth on Boxrec. In an interview on Gladrap Channel on YouTube, Benjamin Thomas Watt who helps promoter Peres, announced that her manager is in the middle of negotiations for a World title fight. Peres was scheduled to fight Nailini Helu on 6 December 2018, however due to failing police permit, Helu was not able to fight and trish Vaka stepped in on three days notice. Geovana won the fight by Unanimous Decision, winning every round and dominating the fight.

=== WBO light heavyweight title ===
On 17 December 2018, it was announced that Peres will be going against Lani Daniels in a rematch for the WBO World Light Heavyweight title. The event took place on 30 March 2018 in Auckland New Zealand. Geovana Peres won the inuguarl WBO world title by unanimous decision in front of a sold-out crowd. Shortly after the fight, Geovana Peres signed a three-fight deal with Rival Sports Promotion NZ, which is managed by Bruce Glozier and Steve Deane.

On 30 July 2019, Geovana Peres promoter, Bruce Glozier, announced that Peres will defend her WBO World Women's light heavyweight title against Claire Hafner at Sky City Convention Centre in Auckland, New Zealand on 4 October 2019. Peres started promoting the fight by doing boxing training pad works on the Sky walk 193 metres off the ground on the Sky Tower. Peres won the bout by Referee stoppage between the 8th and the 9th round.

On 26 January 2021, it was announced that Geovana Peres had officially retired from boxing, ending her career as a world champion.

== Kickboxing and Muay Thai career ==
On 16 April 2021, Geovana Peres made her amateur muay thai fight debut against IFMA Junior Gold Medalist and GAMMA World Champion Roezala Su’e. Peres lost the fight by split decision with her first loss in combat sports in four years. On 13 August, Peres won her first kickboxing fight against Gina Gee. Peres won the fight by unanimous decision with her winning the inaugural Fau Vake Warrior's Heart Memorial Shield.

=== Faith McMah rivalry ===
On 12 October 2022, it was announced that Peres would compete in her third muay thai fight on 5 November against former MMA New Zealand star Faith McMah. This fight will be for the WMC New Zealand heavyweight title. Peres won the fight by a close split decision. On the 22 June 2024, Peres returned to the ring when she attempted to capture her second New Zealand title, where she fought Faith McMah in a rematch at Mercury Bay Park Arena in Tauranga for the first-ever WBC New Zealand National Muay Thai Heavyweight title. The WBC Muay Thai sanctioning body has never sanctioned a heavyweight belt in the women's division before. Peres won the fight by a close Split Decision, winning her second New Zealand Muay Thai National title and becoming the first female to not only win a Heavyweight title with WBC but also first female to win two national title in each Muay Thai and Boxing. After the fight she called out to WBC Muay Thai to give here a chance and let her fight for the first ever WBC Muay Thai World Heavyweight title in the women's division.

== Combat sport titles ==
=== Amateur boxing titles ===
- 2016 New Zealand North Island Golden Gloves Gold medallist
  - Defeated Ruby Tefuga 3–0

=== Professional boxing titles ===
- New Zealand National Boxing Federation
  - New Zealand National Light Heavyweight Title
- Professional Boxing Commission New Zealand
  - New Zealand National Light Heavyweight Title (174¾ Ibs)
- World Boxing Organisation
  - World Light Heavyweight title

=== Kickboxing and Muay Thai titles ===
- World Muay Thai Council (WMC)
  - New Zealand Heavyweight Title
- World Boxing Council Muay Thai (WBC)
  - New Zealand Heavyweight Title

== Fight record ==
=== Professional boxing record ===
9 fights	8 wins	1 loss
By knockout	1	0
By decision	7	1

No.	Result	Record	Opponent	Type	Round, time	Date	Location	Notes
9	Win	8–1	(Canada) Claire Hafner	RTD	8 (10), 2:00	4 Oct 2019	SkyCity, Auckland, New Zealand	Retained WBO female light-heavyweight title
8	Win	7–1	(New Zealand) Lani Daniels	UD	10	30 Mar 2019	SkyCity, Auckland, New Zealand	Won vacant WBO female light-heavyweight title
7	Win	6–1	(New Zealand) Trish Vaka	UD	6	6 Dec 2018	Ellerslie Event Centre, Auckland, New Zealand	
6	Win	5–1	(New Zealand) Lani Daniels	SD	10	16 Mar 2018	ABA Stadium, Auckland, New Zealand	Retained PBCNZ female light-heavyweight title
5	Win	4–1	(New Zealand) Tessa Tualevao	UD	4	14 Dec 2017	ABA Stadium, Auckland, New Zealand	
4	Win	3–1	(New Zealand) Trish Vaka	UD	8	13 Oct 2017	ABA Stadium, Auckland, New Zealand	Won vacant PBCNZ female light-heavyweight title
3	Win	2–1	(New Zealand) Tessa Tualevao	UD	4	1 Jul 2017	Manurewa Netball Centre, Manurewa, New Zealand	
2	Win	1–1	(New Zealand) Nailini Helu	UD	8	21 Apr 2017	ABA Stadium, Auckland, New Zealand	Won vacant NZNBF female light-heavyweight title
1	Loss	0–1	(New Zealand) Sarah Long	UD	4	10 Mar 2017	ABA Stadium, Auckland, New Zealand	

=== Kickboxing and Muay Thai record ===
4 fights	3 wins	1 loss
By decision	3	1

No.	Result	Record	Opponent	Type	Round, time	Date	Location	Notes
4	Win	3–1	(New Zealand) Faith McMah	SD	5	22 Jun 2024	Mercury Bay Park Arena, Tauranga , New Zealand	Pro Muay Thai vacant WBC New Zealand National Heavyweight title
3	Win	2–1	(New Zealand) Faith McMah	SD	5	5 Nov 2022	Community Centre, Te Atatū Peninsula, Auckland, New Zealand	Pro Muay Thai; Won vacant WMC New Zealand Heavyweight title
2	Win	1–1	(New Zealand) Gina Gee	UD	3	13 Aug 2021	Community Centre, Te Atatū Peninsula, Auckland, New Zealand	Pro Kickboxing; Won the Fau Vake Warrior's Heart Memorial Shield
1	Loss	0–1	(New Zealand) Roezala Su'e	SD	3	16 Apr 2021	Community Centre, Te Atatū Peninsula, Auckland, New Zealand	Amateur Muay Thai

== Research ==
In 2012, Geovana Peres was credited for contributing to research at Auckland University at their Liggins Institute. The research was about pregnant obese women exercising during pregnancy and the effects on the offspring and their own health. Peres was the assistant physiologist for the research. The Research article was released in 2014.

== Personal life ==
In July 2018, Geovana Peres became a New Zealand citizen.

== Awards and recognitions ==
- New Zealand LGBTI Awards
  - 2018 Sports Personality of the Year (Nominated)
- linealboxingchampion.com
  - World Lineal Heavyweight Champion
- New Zealand Boxing Awards
  - 2019 Gladrap Awards Best looking female boxer of the year (Nominated)
  - 2019 Gladrap Awards Champion of the year (Won)
  - 2019 Gladrap Awards Knockout of the year (Nominated)
  - 2019 Gladrap Awards International fight of the year (Nominated)
  - 2019 Gladrap New Zealand Fight of the year (Won)
  - 2019 Gladrap Female Boxer of the Year (Won)
  - 2019 Gladrap Boxer of the Year (Won)
- City Kickboxing
  - 2021 Fau Vake Warrior's Heart Memorial Shield (Won)
