= Alrie Meleisea =

New Zealand boxer (born 1992)

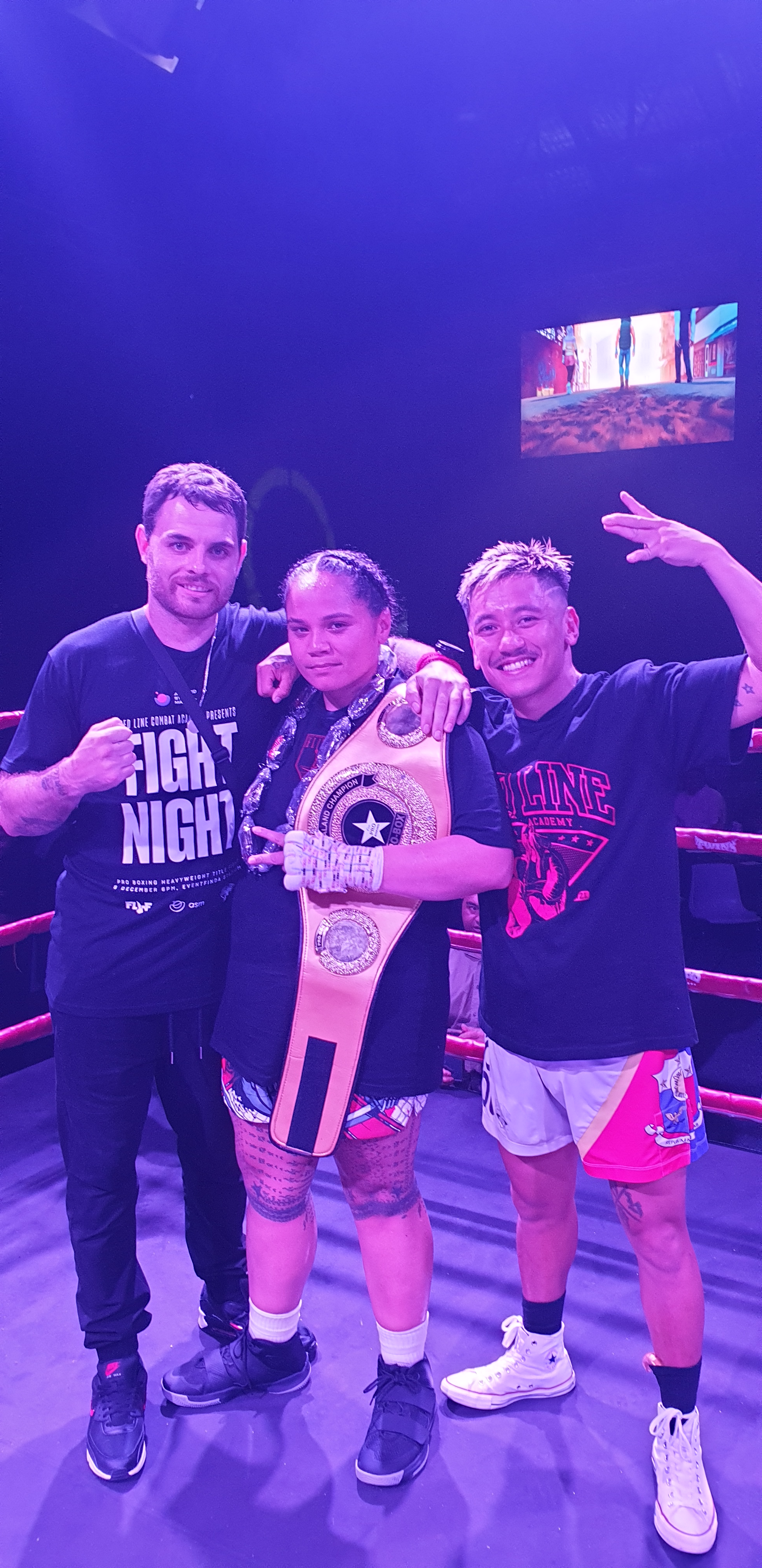
- Born: Alrie Meleisea Felix; 22 November 1992 (age 33); Auckland, New Zealand
- Nationality: New Zealander
- Height: 170 cm (5 ft 7 in)
- Weight: 98.2 kg (216 lb; 15 st 6 lb)
- Division: Heavyweight
- Style: Boxing; MMA
- Years active: 2016–present

Professional boxing record
- Total: 9
- Wins: 6
- By knockout: 0
- Losses: 2
- By knockout: 0
- Draws: 1

Mixed martial arts record
- Total: 2
- Wins: 2
- By knockout: 1
- By decision: 1
- Losses: 0
- By knockout: 0
- By decision: 0
- Draws: 0

Amateur record
- Total: 4
- Wins: 4
- Losses: 0
- Draws: 0

Other information
- Boxing record from BoxRec
- Last updated on: 12 December 2022

Alrie Meleisea (born 22 November 1992) is a New Zealand professional boxer and MMA fighter. Meleisea is a world title contender where she fought for the IBF World Heavyweight title against Lani Daniels in 2023. Meleisea lost the fight by Unanimous decision. Despite the loss, she became the first female pasifika boxer to fight for a world boxing title. Meleisea is a two time New Zealand Heavyweight Champion and a former UBF Asia Pacific heavyweight champion.

== Early life ==
Meleisea was born in Auckland, New Zealand on 22 November 1992. She trained under Vasco Kovačević at Red Line Combat Academy, who is the same person that trains Robert Berridge. Before turning pro, Meleisea had four corporate boxing bouts, winning all the bouts.

== Professional boxing career ==
=== Beginning of Nailini Helu Rivalry, Debut 2016 ===
On 28 October 2016, Meleisea took on Helu on the Robert Berridge vs Adrian Taihia undercard. Originally the bout was scheduled for Helu to take on Cheyenne Whaanga for the vacant NZPBA female light heavyweight title, however due to injury Whaanga pulled out a week before the fight. Meleisea took the fight on against Helu in 48 hour notice. Helu took the fight easy due to the last minute opponent, however due to this Meleisea won the bout by split decision. This was considered the biggest surprise of the year. On 5 November 2016, Meleisea took on Lupeamanu in Hamilton, New Zealand. Meleisea took the fight on a weeks notice, almost immediately after defeating Helu in her pro debut. Meleisea won the bout by unanimous decision, surprising the New Zealand heavyweight division two weeks in a row. Four months after the bout, Lupeamanu announced that she was forced to retire due to a tumour, making her fight against Meleisea her last professional boxing fight.

=== New Zealand champion, Sarah Long rivalry 2017 - 2019 ===
On 10 March 2017, Meleisea took on Hely for the vacant NZPBA and vacant UBF Asia pacific heavyweight titles. This bout was difficult to make happen, due to Helu had a rematch clause to fight Ange Davis for the vacant NZPBA title. Due to Davis getting injured, Meleisea was next in line for the title shot. Meleisea won the bout by Split decision however the reaction of the audience and social media was split 50/50, some believing it was a controversial decision. On 18 August 2017, it was announced that Meleisea mandatory challenger was Kickboxer Sarah Long. Long at the time had nine fights in Kickboxing and four fights in professional boxing. The fight was originally going to happen in October, but it was postponed due to Promoter and Long's Trainer Terry Tuteru had a fight clash with one of his other boxers. On 6 October 2017, it was announced that the fight would take place at ABA Stadium on 11 November. The fight itself was a really close with Long being knocked down in the second round. Meleisea retained her New Zealand National (NZPBA version) title by unanimous decision.

On 18 May 2018, it was announced that Meleisea will have a rematch against Sarah Long, defending her New Zealand National (NZPBA version) title. This time Sarah Long's manager, Terry Tuteru, promoted the event, under their Ultimate rage event series "Ultimate Rage 5". The bout took place on 23 June 2018 in Onehunga, New Zealand. Meleisea has had a big training camp for this bout, having sparing sessions with Robert Berridge and Gunnar Jackson. On 20 June, it was announced that the bout between Meleisea and Long was postponed due to a death of Meleisea's mother. On 19 September 2019, it was announced that the rematch between Long and Meliesea would happen on 28 September at ABA Stadium. The fight was very close, but the decision ended in controversy. The ending in a draw was adequate, but the scoring from the judges shocked people. Judge 1 Adrian Bently who was acting as Supervisor of the night and the more experienced judge on the panel, had the card 40–36 to Meleisea. Judge 2 Kendall Cooper had the card 38-38. And finally, Judge 3 Smita Tailor who is the least experienced judge out of the panel had the scores 40–36 to Long.

=== Return to boxing, Sequita Hemingway rivalry 2021 - 2022 ===
In July 2021, Meleisea made her boxing return after being away from the ring for 19 months. Meleisea took on professional rugby player Sequita Hemingway. Due to Hemingway height and reach advantage, Meleisea struggled in the fight and received her first loss of her career. In October 2022, it was announced that a rematch would happen between Meleisea and Hemingway in December for the vacant Pro Box NZ New Zealand National heavyweight title. At this time Hemingway is ranked 3rd in the WBA. The winner of the Meleisea vs Hemingway fight would potentially lead to either a world title fight or at least a world title eliminator. Meleisea won the fight by unanimous decision, making her a two time New Zealand Heavyweight champion. After her fight, Meleisea asked if she would be interested in a world title fight against Lani Daniels. She replied “Anytime, anywhere, any place,” officially calling out Daniels.

=== World Title fight, Lani Daniels rivalry 2023 ===
In January 2023, Meleisea receive a ranking of 5th on the ESPN Women's Boxing rankings. In January 2023, it was announced that Meleisea was in negotiations with Lani Daniels team for a potential world title fight in May. On 14 January, it was confirmed the fight between Daniels and Meleisea will happen on May 27 at eventfinda stadium for the first ever IBF Female heavyweight title. In February 2023, Meleisea received her highest world ranking of 2nd in the IBF. She also received the ranking of 2nd in the WBO in March 2023. Meleisea lost the fight by unanimous decision.

== Personal life ==
Meleisea has tattoos on her legs called a Malu as part of her Samoan heritage. The tattoo took 10 hours in over 5 days at a young age.

== Professional boxing titles ==
- New Zealand Professional Boxing Association
  - New Zealand National female heavyweight title (198 Ibs)
- Universal Boxing Federation
  - UBF Asia pacific female heavyweight title (198 Ibs)
- Pro Box NZ
  - New Zealand National female heavyweight title (216½ Ibs)

== Combat record ==
=== Boxing record ===
9 fights	6 wins	2 losses
By knockout	0	0
By decision	6	2
Draws	1	

No.	Result	Record	Opponent	Type	Round, time	Date	Location	Notes
9	Loss	6–2–1	(New Zealand) Lani Daniels	UD	10	27 May 2023	Eventfinda, Auckland, New Zealand	Lost vacant IBF World Heavyweight title
8	Win	6–1–1	(New Zealand) Sequita Hemingway	UD	8	9 December 2022	Eventfinda, Auckland, New Zealand	Won vacant Pro Box NZ Heavyweight title
7	Lose	5–1–1	(New Zealand) Sequita Hemingway	MD	4	10 July 2021	The Plaza, Putaruru, New Zealand	
6	Win	5–0–1	(New Zealand) Ashley Campbell	UD	6	29 November 2019	North Shore Events Centre, Auckland, New Zealand	
5	Draw	4–0–1	(New Zealand) Sarah Long	SD	4	28 September 2019	ABA Stadium, Auckland, New Zealand	
4	Win	4–0	(New Zealand) Sarah Long	UD	8	11 November 2017	ABA Stadium, Auckland, New Zealand	Defended NZPBA female heavyweight titles
3	Win	3–0	(Tonga) Nailini Helu	SD	6	10 March 2017	ABA Stadium, Auckland, New Zealand	won vacant NZPBA and UBF Asia Pacific female heavyweight titles
2	Win	2–0	(New Zealand) Kirsty Lupeamanu	UD	4	5 November 2016	Hamilton Cosmopolitan Club, Hamilton, New Zealand	
1	Win	1–0	(Tonga) Nailini Helu	SD	3	28 October 2016	ASB Stadium, Kohimarama, New Zealand	

=== MMA record ===
Professional record breakdown
2 matches	2 wins	0 losses
By knockout	1	0
By decision	1	0
Draws	0	

Res.	Record	Opponent	Method	Event	Date	Round	Time	Location	Notes
Win	2–0	(New Zealand) Virtue Maea	Unanimous Decision	Princesses of Pain 47	30 July 2016	3	3:00	ABA Stadium, Auckland, New Zealand	
Win	1–0	(New Zealand) Jade Snare	KO (Punches)	Princesses of Pain 46	21 November 2015	1	0:18	ABA Stadium, Auckland, New Zealand	

== Awards and recognitions ==
- New Zealand Boxing Awards
  - 2019 Gladrap Boxing Awards Best looking female boxer of the year (Nominated)
  - 2019 Gladrap Boxing Awards Female Boxer of the Year (Nominated)
  - 2019 Gladrap Boxing Awards Returning Boxer of the Year (Won)
  - 2023 New Zealand Fight of the year (Won)
