= Daniella Smith =

New Zealand boxer (born 1972)

- Born: 30 July 1972 (age 54); Kaikohe, New Zealand
- Other names: Diamond
- Nationality: New Zealand
- Weight: 60.9 kg (134 lb; 9 st 8 lb)
- Division: Lightweight
- Stance: Orthodox
- Years active: 1999–2014

Professional boxing record
- Total: 19
- Wins: 13
- By knockout: 1
- Losses: 6
- By knockout: 2

Amateur record
- Total: 40
- Wins: 34
- Losses: 6

Other information
- Occupation: Former Professional Boxer, Personal Trainer
- Website: http://www.daniellasmith.co.nz/
- Boxing record from BoxRec
- Last updated on: 28 January 2017

Daniella Smith (born 30 July 1972, in Kaikohe, New Zealand) is a New Zealand former professional boxer. She became the first female fighter to win an IBF title, having held the welterweight version from 2010 to 2011, and is the third New Zealand-born person to win a boxing world title in 120 years, after Torpedo Bill Murphy (1890) and before Joseph Parker in 2016 with World Boxing Organisation. Smith was once ranked pound-for-pound number one in New Zealand of all time in the Women's division according to boxrec. Smith held the record for holding the most New Zealand national professional titles, winning two NZPBA New Zealand national titles in the welterweight and super welterweight division. She held this record for fourteen years, until Mea Motu beat the record when Motu won her third New Zealand title in 2022.

== Amateur career ==
In 1999, Smith started her career as an amateur. In a space of six years, she has fought in forty fights, winning multiple titles including the gold at the national championships four times. She also competed in the 2002 World Championships in Turkey, and even though she was not successful in winning a medal, she still won a gold medal in 2004 at the Oceania Games. She briefly held the record for most New Zealand national amateur championships, before Alexis Pritchard broke the record in 2007.

== Professional career ==
In 2005 Smith made her pro debut against World Kicking Champion Sue Glassey. In 2006, Smith won against Glassey for the second time, but this time to capture her first pro boxing title (vacant NZPBA Women's light middleweight title). In 2010, Smith fought for the first time as a pro outside New Zealand, winning against Jennifer Retzke in Germany and becoming the first International Boxing Federation Women's World Champion. Smith defended her title against Noni Tenge in South Africa seven months after winning the title but lost the bout by technical knockout in the fourth round. In 2013 Smith attempted to capture her second world title against Arlene Blencowe for the vacant Women's International Boxing Association World Super lightweight title and the vacant World Boxing Federation female welterweight title, but Smith was unsuccessful in capturing the titles. In 2014, Smith fought her last fight against Gentiane Lupi. This is the second time that Smith has fought Lupi, but this time for the vacant NZPBA women's lightweight title, but Smith was unsuccessful. She was inducted into the International Women's Boxing Hall of Fame in 2024.

== Training ==
In September 2016, one of Smith's amateur boxers turned pro. Cheyenne Whaanga made her pro debut against kickboxer Sarah Long, winning the bout by Unanimous decision, winning all the rounds.

In 2026, She started training two division world champion Lani Daniels. Daniels would take on Shadasia Green for the Unified World IBF, WBO and The Ring female super-middleweight titles. Daniels won the fight by 9th round stoppage, becoming a three division world champion.

== Awards ==
- New Zealand Maori Sports Awards scholarship (2002)
- Northland Maori Sportswoman of the Year (2007)
- 2019 Gladrap Boxing Hall of fame
- 2019 Gladrap Boxing Awards Event of the Year Nominated
- 2019 Gladrap Boxing Awards Commentator of the Year Nominated
- 2023 Te Tai Tokerau Māori Sports Awards Te Tangi a Tūkaiāia – Lifetime Achievement Award Nominated
- 2024 International Women's boxing hall of fame

== Amateur titles ==
- Silver Medal 75 kg New Zealand National Championship (1999)
- Gold Medal 75 kg New Zealand National Championship (2000)
- Gold Medal 75 kg New Zealand National Championship (2001)
- Bronze Medal Oceania Championship (2002)
- Gold Medal 75 kg New Zealand National Championship (2003)
- Gold Medal 75 kg New Zealand National Championship (2004)
- Gold Medal 70 kg Oceania Championship (2004)

== Professional titles ==
- New Zealand Professional Boxing Association
  - New Zealand National female light middleweight title (2006)
  - New Zealand National female welterweight title (2008)
- International Boxing Federation
  - IBF Women's World Welterweight Title (2010)

== Professional boxing record ==
19 fights	13 wins	6 losses
By knockout	1	2
By decision	12	4
Draws	0	

Res.	Record	Opponent	Type	Rd., Time	Date	Location	Notes
Lose	13–6	(New Zealand) Gentiane Lupi	TKO	5 (10) 1:45	2014-12-13	ABA Stadium, Auckland, New Zealand	For vacant NZPBA Women's lightweight title
Lose	13–5	(New Zealand) Gentiane Lupi	MD	6	2014-06-27	ABA Stadium, Auckland, New Zealand	
Win	13–4	(New Zealand) Nicki Bigwood	TKO	5 (6)	2013-12-13	ABA Stadium, Auckland, New Zealand	
Lose	12–4	(Australia) Arlene Blencowe	UD	10	2013-06-13	The Trusts Arena, Auckland, New Zealand	For vacant WIBA super lightweight title and vacant WBF female welterweight title
Win	12–3	(Australia) Lauryn Eagle	UD	6	2012-12-15	The Trusts Arena, Auckland, New Zealand	
Win	11–3	(New Zealand) Lisa Mauala	UD	6	2012-08-25	The Corporate Box, Auckland, New Zealand	
Lose	10–3	(Australia) Sarah Howett	UD	8	2012-03-30	ABA Stadium, Auckland, New Zealand	
Lose	10–2	(South Africa) Noni Tenge	TKO	4 (10)	2011-06-11	Carnival City, Brakpan, South Africa	Lost IBF female welterweight title
Win	10–1	(Germany) Jennifer Retzke	UD	10	2010-11-12	Circus Arena Altglienicke, Berlin, Germany	Won inaugural IBF female welterweight title
Win	9–1	(Argentina) Gabriela Marcela Zapata	UD	8	2010-08-27	ABA Stadium, Auckland, New Zealand	
Win	8–1	(New Zealand) Lisa Mauala	UD	6	2009-03-07	Rugby Park, Gisborne, New Zealand	
Win	7–1	(New Zealand) Lisa Mauala	UD	6	2008-12-13	ABA Stadium, Auckland, New Zealand	Won vacant NZPBA Women's welterweight title
Win	6–1	(New Zealand) (Australia) Nive Moefaauo	SD	6	2008-06-28	TSB Bank Arena, Wellington, New Zealand	
Lose	5–1	(United States) Layla McCarter	UD	6	2007-11-02	Sky City Convention Centre, Auckland, New Zealand	
Win	5–0	(South Africa) Sandra Almeida	UD	4	2007-06-08	Sky City Convention Centre, Auckland, New Zealand	
Win	4–0	(United States) Victoria Cisneros	SD	6	2006-11-17	Sky City Convention Centre, Auckland, New Zealand	
Win	3–0	(New Zealand) Sue Glassey	UD	6	2006-05-06	Headhunters Motorcycle Club, Auckland, New Zealand	Vacant NZPBA Women's light middleweight title
Win	2–0	(New Zealand) Renei Bevims	UD	4	2005-12-16	Coral Reef Restaurant, Auckland, New Zealand	
Win	1–0	(New Zealand) Sue Glassey	UD	4	2005-03-31	The Trusts Arena, Auckland, New Zealand	

Vacant	NZPBA Super Welterweight; Title; 6 May 2006 – 13 December 2014	Vacant Retired
Vacant	NZPBA Welterweight; Title; 12 December 2008 – 13 December 2014	Vacant Retired
Vacant	IBF Women's World Welterweight; Title; 12 November 2010 – 11 June 2011	Succeeded by Noni Tenge
