= New Zealand Professional Boxing Association =

- Sport: Professional boxing
- Jurisdiction: New Zealand
- Abbreviation: NZPBA
- Founded: 1966
- Affiliation: World Boxing Association; World Boxing Council; International Boxing Federation; World Boxing Organisation; World Boxing Federation; Commonwealth Boxing Council; Australian National Boxing Federation
- Headquarters: Auckland
- President: Kylie Bell
- Vice president(s): 1st Jo Gallagher; 2nd Barry Galbraith
- Secretary: Tui Gallagher
- (New Zealand)

New Zealand Professional Boxing Association (NZPBA) is one of the four governing bodies for the sport of professional boxing in New Zealand. NZPBA is a non-profit organisation.

== History ==
The body was founded as South Pacific Boxing Association, with the name changed to New Zealand Professional Boxing Association Inc. in 1984 at its AGM. The new name was greeted and accepted by the World Bodies and Commonwealth Boxing Council.

In 2006, NZPBA had its first female national champion with Daniella Smith defeating Sue Glassey for the super welterweight title. Smith is New Zealand's second professional national champion.

In April 2016, NZPBA sanctioned New Zealand's first major world title fight (from one of the four major sanctioning bodies) for the WBC female middleweight title with Kali Reis defeating Maricela Cornejo by split decision. The fight night also featured two of New Zealand's first WBC Silver title fights with Melissa St. Vil defeating Baby Nansen and Ronica Jeffrey defeating Gentiane Lupi. On the same night, NZPBA had New Zealand's first female professional boxing referee, with Shelley Ashton officiating Nailini Helu vs. Kirsty Lupeamanu.

== Controversy ==
Former NZPBA President Lance Revill is known for sharing his opinions with New Zealand's local media, causing major scrutiny to the association. He drew particular attention for his comments directed at Joseph Parker. Since the beginning of Parker's career, Revill has made regular comments about Parker, including when he turned pro, alleging that Parker's promoters were only interested in money, that Parker was too hyped up and that Parker didn't win his world title fight in December 2016. In February 2017, it was announced that due to backlash against his comments against Parker, Revill resigned as president of NZPBA. Vice President John Conway was named interim president.

In 2018, NZPBA officiated a corporate boxing event in Christchurch in November where first-time corporate boxer Kain Parsons was knocked unconscious. Kain Parsons was taken to Christchurch Hospital's intensive care unit, but he died four days later after the event. The vice president of the organisation at the time, Kevin Pyne, was the referee of the fight. Former NZPBA President Lance Revill stated that he believed the fight should have been stopped earlier. In 2019, Kevin Pyne was elected president of NZPBA, despite being the referee of the fight.

== Current roles ==
=== Board members ===
President: Kylie Bell

Vice president: 1st Jo Gallagher, 2nd Barry Galbraith

National secretary: Tui Gallagher

National treasurer: James Dellows

Regional rep - Canterbury: Kevin Pyne

Regional rep - Wellington/Lower North Island: Joel Revill

Regional rep - BOP/Waikato: Mike Francis

Regional rep - Northland/Auckland: John Conway

== Current national champions ==
=== Men ===
Weight class	NZPBA Champion	NZPBA reign began
Heavyweight	Junior Fa	18 March 2017
Cruiserweight	Asher Derbyshire	29 April 2016
Light-heavyweight	Vacant	—
Super-middleweight	Ricaia Warren	15 November 2025
Middleweight	Vacant	—
Super-welterweight	Bowyn Morgan	22 June 2018
Welterweight	Vacant	—
Super-lightweight	Vacant	—
Lightweight	Nort Beauchamp	4 May 2019

=== Women ===
Weight class	NZPBA Champion	NZPBA reign began
Heavyweight	Sarah Long	13 October 2018
Light-heavyweight	Lani Daniels	18 November 2017
Super-welterweight	Daniella Smith	6 May 2006
Welterweight	Daniella Smith	13 December 2008
Lightweight	Mea Motu	26 March 2021
Super-featherweight	Rebecca Jennings	10 September 2016
Bantamweight	Christine Gillespie	2 November 2024

== Current provincial champions ==
=== NZPBA Central title ===
==== Heavyweight men ====
Name	Beginning of reign	Opponent	Defences
Kiki Toa Leutele	6 October 2018	Thomas Russell	0

==== Middleweight men ====
Name	Beginning of reign	Opponent	Defences
Gunnar Jackson	24 November 2018	Blake Bell	0

== See also ==
- List of New Zealand female boxing champions
- List of New Zealand heavyweight boxing champions
- List of New Zealand cruiserweight boxing champions
- List of New Zealand light heavyweight boxing champions
- List of New Zealand super middleweight boxing champions
- List of New Zealand middleweight boxing champions
- List of New Zealand super welterweight boxing champions
- List of New Zealand welterweight boxing champions
- List of New Zealand super lightweight boxing champions
- List of New Zealand lightweight boxing champions
- List of New Zealand super featherweight boxing champions
- List of New Zealand featherweight boxing champions
- List of New Zealand bantamweight boxing champions
- Australian National Boxing Federation
- Commonwealth Boxing Council
