= ABA Stadium =

Combat sport stadium in New Zealand

- The Home of Auckland Boxing
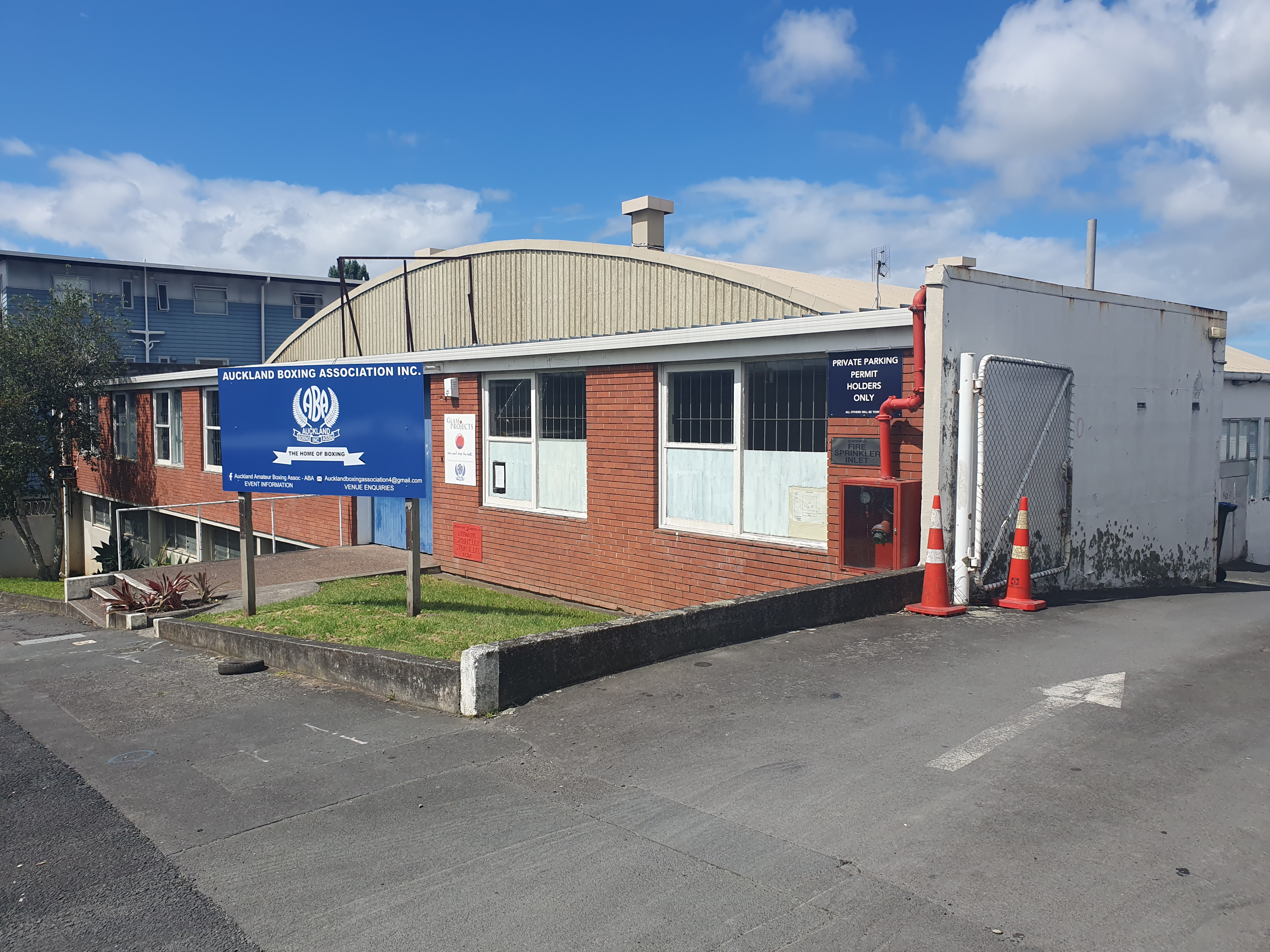
- Interactive map of ABA Stadium
- Full name: Auckland Boxing Association inc Stadium
- Location: 1 Ngahura Street, Eden Terrace, Auckland New Zealand
- Coordinates: 36.86762°S 174.75697°E
- Seating type: Combat Sports Facility
- Capacity: 400

Website
- www.aucklandboxingassociationinc.com

Auckland Boxing Association Stadium (also known as ABA Stadium) is a New Zealand venue for combat sports hosting over 150 events in boxing alone. ABA Stadium is also recognized for its grassroots of boxing. The earliest reported professional boxing event according to Boxrec was in June 1992 where Jimmy Thunder fought Craig Petersen for the Australian Title.

== Wall of Champions ==
On the walls at the entrance and bar of ABA Stadium, there are photos of all notable champions from Shane Cameron winning the Commonwealth title to David Tua for being World title contender. Also on the walls are photos of amateur boxing class each year from the Auckland Boxing Association.

== Notable boxers fought at the venue ==
- Shane Cameron Commonwealth Champion.
- Maselino Masoe World Boxing Association World Champion.
- Daniella Smith World's first International Boxing Federation World Champion.
- Robert Berridge WBA World Title Contender.
- Gentiane Lupi Women's International Boxing Association World Champion.
- Geovana Peres WBO Light Heavyweight World Champion.
- Junior Fa Bronze medalist Commonwealth Games
- David Light Silver medalist Commonwealth Games

== Notable bouts ==
- 17 June 2010 Soulan Pownceby defeated Joel Casey for the World Boxing Foundation World light heavyweight title and the WBO Asia Pacific light heavyweight title
- 27 August 2010 Daniella Smith defeated Gabriela Marcela Zapata. This bout was set up to prepare Smith for her fight for the IBF World title in Germany.
- 1 June 2012 Soulan Pownceby defeated Daniel MacKinnon for the WBO Asia Pacific light heavyweight title. This was also Pownceby's last fight due to receiving a neck injury that required surgery.
- 29 June 2012 Steve Heremaia defeated Lee Oti for the vacant WBO Oriental middleweight title. It was the third time the two had met.
- 13 December 2014 Gentiane Lupi defeated Daniella Smith for the Vacant NZPBA Women's Lightweight title.
- 18 May 2019 David Light defeated Mark Flanagan for the WBO Oriental Cruiserweight title.
