= Nansen (disambiguation) =

Fridtjof Nansen (1861–1930) was a Norwegian polar explorer, scientist, diplomat, humanitarian, and Nobel laureate.

Nansen may also refer to:

== People ==
- Nansen (surname)
- Nansen Fugan, the Japanese name for the Tang dynasty Chan (Zen) Buddhist master Nanquan Puyuan

== Ships ==
- Fridtjof Nansen-class frigate, the main surface combatant units of the Royal Norwegian Navy
- HNoMS Fridtjof Nansen (1930), a Norwegian coast guard ship
- HNoMS Fridtjof Nansen (F310), a 2004 frigate of the Royal Norwegian Navy

== Places ==
- Cape Nansen, headland in the Greenland Sea, east Greenland
- Mount Nansen (Antarctica)
- Mount Fridtjof Nansen, Antarctica
- Mount Nansen (Yukon) in Yukon, Canada
- Nansen Island (disambiguation)
- Nansen Land, Greenland
- Fridtjof Nansen Land, a suggested but not adopted name for an area of Greenland
- Nansen (lunar crater)
- Nansen (Martian crater)
- Nansen Sound, a strait in Nunavut, Canada, between Ellesmere Island and Axel Heiberg Island
- Fridtjof Nansen Peninsula, SE Greenland

== Organisations ==
- Nansen International Office for Refugees (French: Office international Nansen pour les réfugiés), a 1930–1939 League of Nations organization
- Nansen Institute, an independent research foundation in Norway
- Nansenhjelpen, also known as Nansen Relief in English, a Norwegian humanitarian organisation

== Other ==
- The Nansen Refugee Award
- Nansen (biography), a 1940 children's biography of the explorer by Anna Gertrude Hall
- Nansen (cat), ship's cat on Belgica during the Belgian Antarctic Expedition in 1897–98
- Nansen passport, internationally recognized identity cards first issued by the League of Nations to stateless refugees
- Nansen bottle, an oceanographic sampling device
