= Nansen (surname) =

Nansen is a surname which is mostly used in the Scandinavian countries. People with the surname are as follows:

- Antz Nansen (born 1983), New Zealand boxer
- Baby Nansen (born 1987) New Zealand boxer
- Brandon Nansen (born 1993), New Zealand rugby player
- Betty Nansen (1873–1943), Danish actress and theater director
- Eigil Nansen (1931–2017), Norwegian athlete and architect; son of Odd Nansen
- Eva Nansen (1858–1907), Norwegian opera singer
- Fridtjof Nansen (1861–1930), Norwegian scientist, polar explorer and diplomat
- Hans Nansen (1598–1667), Danish statesman
- Johnny Nansen (born 1974), Samoan-born American football player
- Karin Nansen, Uruguayan activist
- Odd Nansen (1901–1973), Norwegian architect and humanitarian; son of Fridtjof Nansen
- Peter Nansen (1861–1918), Danish novelist, journalist, and publisher
