= Jordan Tai =

New Zealand kick boxer

- Born: Jordan Tai; 21 March 1982 (age 44); Auckland, New Zealand
- Nationality: New Zealander
- Height: 185 cm (6 ft 1 in)
- Weight: 167.4 lb (76 kg; 11 st 13 lb)
- Reach: 178 cm (70.1 in)
- Stance: Orthodox

Professional boxing record
- Total: 13
- Wins: 10
- By knockout: 9
- Losses: 3
- By knockout: 2
- Draws: 0
- No contests: 0

Kickboxing record
- Total: 81
- Wins: 57
- By knockout: 28
- Losses: 19
- Draws: 5

Other information
- Occupation: Boxer
- Notable relatives: Daniel Tai
- Boxing record from BoxRec

Jordan Tai (born 21 March 1982) is a New Zealand welterweight kickboxer and a middleweight boxer. He is a two time K-1 MAX New Zealand champion who competed in World Elite of K-1 MAX and a New Zealand Boxing Champion.

== Titles ==
- 2016 New Zealand National Boxing Federation Champion
- 2006 SuperLeague Elimination Champion -73 kg
- 2003 K-1 MAX New Zealand Champion
- 2002 K-1 MAX New Zealand Champion
- 2000 WKBF South Pacific Super Lightweight Champion
- 2000 Featherweight Golden Gloves
- 2000 Lightweight Golden Gloves

== Professional boxing record ==
10 wins (9 knockouts, 1 decision), 3 losses (2 knockouts, 0 decisions), 0 draws
Res.	Record	Opponent	Type	Rd., time	Date	Location	Notes
Lose	10–3	(New Zealand) Mose Auimatagi Jnr	UD	3	2017-04-07	ASB Stadium, Auckland, New Zealand	King in the Ring - 4-man super middleweight boxing tournament Final
Win	10–2	(Fiji) Edwin Samy	KO	3, (3) 1:54	2017-04-07	ASB Stadium, Auckland, New Zealand	King in the Ring - 4-man super middleweight boxing tournament Semi Final
Win	9–2	(New Zealand) Jame Uoka	TKO	1, (4) 2:05	2017-03-11	ABA Stadium, Auckland, New Zealand	
Lose	8–2	(New Zealand) Jonathan Taylor	TKO	7, (10) 2:53	2016-11-12	AMI Netball Centre, St Johns, New Zealand	vacant NZPBA & vacant IBO Oceania super middleweight title
Win	8–1	(New Zealand) Joe Blackbourn	KO	1, (10) 2:28	2016-05-21	Vodafone Events Centre, Manukau City, New Zealand	Retained NZNBF super middleweight Title
Loss	7–1	(Australia) David Toussaint	TKO	4, (10) 0:49	2016-04-01	(Australia) The Trusts Arena, Auckland, New Zealand	Vacant ANBF & NZPBA Australasian Super Middleweight title
Win	7–0	(New Zealand) Sam Loli	RTD	8, (10) 3:00	2016-02-25	ABA Stadium, Auckland, New Zealand	Vacant NZNBF super middleweight Title
Win	6–0	(Samoa) Tony Iapesa	KO	7, (8) 2:45	2016-01-23	Faleata Sports Complex, Apia, Samoa	
Win	5–0	(New Zealand) Mose Auimatagi Jnr	UD	6	2015-11-06	ABA Stadium, Auckland, New Zealand	
Win	4–0	(Tonga) (New Zealand) Panuve Helu	TKO	3, (4)	2015-10-06	Manurewa Netball Centre, Manurewa, New Zealand	
Win	3–0	(Iraq) (New Zealand) Sivan Hermez	TKO	2, (4)	2015-09-11	ABA Stadium, Auckland, New Zealand	
Win	2–0	(Samoa) (New Zealand) Ben Vili	RTD	2,(4) 3:00	2013-09-29	Manurewa Netball Centre, Manurewa, New Zealand	
Win	1–0	(New Zealand) Corey Burton	KO	1, (4)	2003-08-01	ABA Stadium, Kohimarama, New Zealand	

== Kickboxing record ==
Kickboxing record
57 wins (28 (T)KOs), 20 losses, 5 draws
Date	Result	Opponent	Event	Location	Method	Round	Time
2017-11-18	Loss	(Russia) Islam Murtazaev	EM Legend 25	Zunyi, China	Decision	3	3:00
2012-10-20	Loss	(China) Yi Long	Wu Lin Feng	He'nan, China	Decision (unanimous)	3	3:00
2012-06-24	Loss	(Australia) John Wayne Parr	Boonchu Cup: Caged Muay Thai	Australia	KO (uppercut)	4	2:11
2012-04-28	Win	(Greece) Vasilis Kakarikos	Power Promotions - The Showdown	Melbourne, Australia	KO	4	2:30
2011-09-24	Loss	(China) Zhou Zhipeng	Wu Lin Feng	Kuala Lumpur, Malaysia	Decision (unanimous)	3	3:00
2011-08-05	Loss	(Australia) Wes Capper	SUPERFIGHT PROMOTION	Perth, Australia	Decision	5	3:00
2011-07-23	Win	(Malaysia) Kai Chee	Phillip Lam Promotions - NZ vs Malaysia	Auckland, New Zealand	TKO	1	2:30
2011-06-11	Loss	(China) Zhou Zhipeng	Wu Lin Feng	He'nan, China	Decision (unanimous)	3+1	3:00
2011-04-02	Loss	(Australia) Steve Moxon	Kings of Kombat 3	Keysborough, Australia	Majority decision	3	3:00
2010-08-29	Draw	(Australia) Steve Moxon	Kings of Combat 2010	Keysborough, Australia	Decision draw	3	-
2010-06-29	Draw	(France) Pete Davies	King Combat	Keysborough, Australia	Draw	3	3:00
2008-05-31	Loss	(United Arab Emirates) Dzhabar Askerov	K-1 Scandinavia MAX 2008, Quarter Finals	Stockholm, Sweden	TKO (referee stoppage, eye injury)	2	0:41
2008-04-09	Loss	(Ukraine) Artur Kyshenko	K-1 World MAX 2008 Final 16	Hiroshima, Japan	Ext.R decision (unanimous)	4	3:00
Fails to qualify for K-1 World MAX 2008 Final 8.
2007-03-25	Loss	(Australia) Daniel Dawson	K-1 World MAX 2007 World Elite Showcase	Yokohama, Japan	Decision (unanimous)	3	3:00
2007-03-25	Loss	(Brazil) Marfio Canoletti	Ichigeki Bulgaria	Varna, Bulgaria	Decision (unanimous)	5	3:00
2006-11-03	Loss	(Japan) Hiroki Shishido	Shoot Boxing World Tournament 2006, Quarter Finals	Tokyo, Japan	Ext.R decision (unanimous)	4	3:00
2006-09-04	Win	(Mongolia) Tsogto Amara	K-1 World MAX 2006 Champions Challenge	Tokyo, Japan	Decision (unanimous)	3	3:00
2006-03-11	Win	(Portugal) José Reis	SuperLeague Elimination 2006, Final	Vienna, Austria	Decision (unanimous)	3	3:00
Wins SuperLeague Elimination 2006 tournament -73kg.
2006-03-11	Win	(Czech Republic) Petr Polak	SuperLeague Elimination 2006, Semi Finals	Vienna, Austria	KO (punches)	2	
2006-03-11	Win	(Czech Republic) Michal Hansgut	SuperLeague Elimination 2006, Reserve Fight	Vienna, Austria	KO (high kick)	2	
2006-03-11	Win	(Egypt) Amir Zeyada	SuperLeague Apocalypse 2006	Paris, France	TKO (ref stop/punches)	2	
2006-01-28	Loss	(England) Peter Crooke	SuperLeague Hungary 2006	Budapest, Hungary	Decision	3	3:00
2005-05-21	Win	(Portugal) José Reis	SuperLeague Germany 2005	Oberhausen, Germany	KO (right high kick)	2	
2005-04-30	Win	(Australia) Ben Burton	K-1 Battle of Anzacs II	Auckland, New Zealand	Decision	3	3:00
2005-04-14	Win	(France) Jean-Charles Skarbowsky	Phillip Lam Muay Thai Promotion	Auckland, New Zealand	TKO (referee stoppage)	1	
2004-11-05	Win	(Morocco) Hamid Boujaoub	K-1 Oceania MAX 2004, Semi Finals	Auckland, New Zealand	Decision	3	3:00
Despite win had to withdraw from competition due to an arm injury.
2004-11-05	Win	(New Zealand) Charles August	K-1 Oceania MAX 2004, Quarter Finals	Auckland, New Zealand	Decision	3	3:00
2004-04-07	Loss	(Thailand) Buakaw Por. Pramuk	K-1 World MAX 2004 World Tournament Open	Tokyo, Japan	Decision (unanimous)	3	3:00
Fails to qualify for K-1 World MAX 2004 Final.
2004-06-16	Win	(Australia) Jenk Behic	Kings of Oceania 2004	Auckland, New Zealand	Decision	3	3:00
2004-04-23	Win	(Australia) Steve Douet	K-1 Battle of Anzacs 2004	Auckland, New Zealand	KO	1	
2003-11-07	Win	(New Zealand) Shane Chapman	K-1 New Zealand 2003, Final	Auckland, New Zealand	Decision (split)	3	3:00
Wins K-1 MAX New Zealand 2003.
2003-11-07	Win	(New Zealand) Dwayne Glasgow	K-1 New Zealand 2003, Semi Finals	Auckland, New Zealand	KO	1	
2003-11-07	Win	(New Zealand) David Gahan	K-1 New Zealand 2003, Quarter Finals	Auckland, New Zealand	KO (right punch + knee)	2	2:10
2003-09-12	Loss	(Croatia) Ante Bilić	K-1 Final Fight - Croatia vs New Zealand	Split, Croatia	Decision (unanimous)	5	3:00
2003-04-11	Draw	(Croatia) Ante Bilić	K-1 Lord of the Rings	Auckland, New Zealand	Decision draw	5	3:00
2002-11-08	Win	(New Zealand) Aaron Boyes	K-1 New Zealand 2002, Final	Auckland, New Zealand	KO		
Wins K-1 MAX New Zealand 2002.
2002-11-08	Win	(New Zealand) Nick Misich	K-1 New Zealand 2002, Semi Finals	Auckland, New Zealand	KO		
2000-10-22	Win	(Australia) Kristian Storek	K-1 New South Wales 2000	Sydney, Australia	Decision	5	2:00
Wins W.K.B.F. South Pacific Super Lightweight title.
2000-02-03	Win	Alan Kilpatrick	Auckland, New Zealand				
Legend: Win Loss Draw/no contest Notes

== Awards and recognitions ==
- 2019 Gladrap Boxing Awards Returning Boxer of the year (nominated)

== See also ==
- List of K-1 events
- List of male kickboxers
