= Korea Federation for Environmental Movements =

The Korea Federation for Environmental Movements (KFEM) is a non-profit organization in South Korea that focuses on environmentalism.

kfem logo

The group was founded in April 1993 as a federation of eight environmental groups, the largest being the Korean Anti-Pollution Movement Association. With approximately 80,000 individual members and around 50 local offices nationwide, KFEM is the largest environmental NGO in South Korea. Having roots in the Korean struggle for democracy, KFEM acts as a civil society leader. It is also the South Korean member of Friends of the Earth International.

Since its founding, the organization has achieved a number of important victories, including stopping projects it has deemed to be environmentally harmful. Prominent examples include the proposed nuclear waste storage facility on Gulup Island, dam construction on the Dong River, and a golf course in Gaya Mountain National Park. KFEM seeks to raise awareness on a variety of environmental issues and offer a forum for the citizens' concerns. The main activities include campaigns, funding and initiating research projects, organizing protests, and leading nature conservation work. The major campaigns address nuclear energy and the transition to renewable energy, toxic chemicals and air pollution, river protection from large dam construction, wetland and water bird conservation, GMOs, and corporate social responsibility. Further, KFEM focuses on specific issues, such as the conservation of wetlands and biodiversity in the demilitarized zone (DMZ) between South and North Korea. KFEM also develops strategies for sustainable development and energy issues and plays a leading role in the international cooperation with regards to global environmental challenges.

== Activities ==
KFEM is nationally and internationally active and works on a variety of smaller and larger projects.

=== Conservation of the Demilitarized Zone and surrounding area ===
The Demilitarized Zone (DMZ) is a buffer area between North and South Korea which was established by the Korean Armistice Agreement on 27 July 1953. The DMZ is about 249 km long and 4 km wide.

Because of the limited human intervention in the DMZ and surrounding areas over the past 50 years, many wildlife species and plants have become established in the region, including endangered species like the black-faced spoonbill, red-crowned crane, and Amur goral. KFEM conducts research and field surveys to determine the ecological value of these areas, especially in terms of biodiversity.

=== River protection ===
South Korea is ranked 7th in the world for the number of dams in the country, while the density of dams ranks first in the world. As of 2008, the country had 39,900 km of reinforced river banks and 129,844 km of water supply facilities.

KFEM has a long history of protesting against large dam construction and other river development projects on environmental grounds. One notable example was their opposition to the proposed Grand Korean Waterway, a 540 kilometer canal linking the Han River and the Nakdong River that would have allowed cargo ships to sail between Seoul and Busan.

=== Wetlands conservation ===
Wetlands in Korea are important breeding, stopover, and wintering sites for a lot of endangered bird species, including the red-crowned, white-naped and hooded cranes, black-faced spoonbills, and various migratory shorebirds. However, since 1990, more than 140,000 ha of coastal wetlands have been reclaimed, or are in the process of being claimed. KFEM has worked to conserve those wetlands, successfully persuading the Korean government to designate several wetlands as protected areas. These include the Upo Wetland, a Ramsar Wetland of International Importance.

KFEM also conducts field surveys on important wetlands, and uses their scientific findings to improve government's wetland policies. They have also raised the public's awareness through various educational exhibitions, and ecotourism activities.

=== Environmental health ===
KFEM's work to protect people from biological and chemical hazards includes campaigns to phase out the use of toxic chemicals such as asbestos in buildings and PVC plastic products, and monitoring indoor air quality of public places such as schools and subways. The organization has also researched the impact that bottled drinking water and IV bags have on the environment and human health.

KFEM also works on food and agricultural issues. The organization supports organic agriculture, and opposes the use of GMOs and artificial food additives. To that end, KFEM conducts independent research to determine the impact of these products on human health and the ecosystem.

=== International cooperation ===
As member of Friends of the Earth International (FoE), KFEM is part of a global network of environmental organizations in 74 countries. Among other projects, KFEM supports FoE's climate change campaign The Big Ask.

In May 1998, KFEM obtained the Special Consultative Status accreditation of the United Nations Economic and Social Council (ECOSOC). Since then, the organization has helped to promote ECOSOC's agenda and values within Korean society. It collaborates with various environmental groups around the world to raise global citizens' voices to protect Korean and global natural resources and ecosystems.

In the past, KFEM has worked on desertification prevention in Northeast China, as increasingly frequent sandstorms there threaten the livelihoods of all peoples across Northeast Asia. KFEM collaborated with Chinese NGOs to plant native grasses in the region, helping to protect and restore the grasslands of northern China. Along with local residents, KFEM has planted 900 hectares of grassland in the alkali desertification zone of Northwest Jilin province from 2003 to 2007, and planted 200 hectares of grassland in Manduh Bulag within the northern part of Inner Mongolia in 2007.

In 2014, KFEM carried out an international project in the wetland areas of the Brazilian Amazon. It also supports the Korean city Suncheon in an exchange with the Brazilian city Curitiba (known as the "Ecological Capital of Brazil").

== Policy goals ==
KFEM pursues a number of policy goals by seeking to, among others:

- create a world of sustainable consumption
- Protect the environmental rights of biologically and socially vulnerable
- Conserve natural ecosystems and build an ecologically friendly land use system in Korea
- Reform laws and institutions to make the public sector more ecologically sound
- Reorganize the industrial structure and taxation system to produce an ecologically sustainable economy
- Work towards denuclearization, both in terms of weapons reduction and power generation solutions
- Build an energy system based on renewable energy and work proactively to mitigate climate change
- Achieve green local governance through grassroots civil society movements
- Strengthen international cooperation and solidarity in order to protect the global environment

== Organization ==
Solar Panels of KFEM Office in Seoul

There are six specialized organizations that are affiliated with KFEM:

=== Citizens' Information Center for Environment (CICE) ===
The Citizens' Information Center for Environment (Information Center) originated from the Information Center of Korean Anti-Pollution Movement Association (KAPMA) in February 1991. It became one of six affiliated organizations of KFEM in February 1995. Managing the KFEM homepage, CICE aims to raise public awareness of environmental issues and suggests eco-friendly policies to society.

Major awareness campaigns run by CICE have called for:

- Protecting the endangered black-faced spoonbills in the Asia Pacific region
- Reducing CO_{2} through promoting bicycle use
- Facilitating three-way sharing of environmental information among NGOs from China, Japan, and Korea (enviroasia.info) [dead-link]
- Reducing electronic waste in the Asia Pacific region
- Establishing the Asia Pacific Alliance (APA) Korean website

=== Citizens' Institute for Environmental Studies (CIES) ===
The Citizens' Institute for Environmental Studies (CIES) was founded in February 1993 to support a systematic and scientifically based professional environmental movement.

The major activities of CIEC are:

- Devising a sustainable development plan with residents, researchers, and other NGOs
- Conducting studies and research on how people's health is affected by environmental pollution and environmental health policy under the motto, "When the environmental aches, the human body aches"
- Studying energy efficiency and strategies for reducing CO_{2} emissions
- Issuing a weekly global newsletter and organizing a yearly citizens' environment workshop

=== Environmental Law Center (ELC) ===
The Environmental Law Center has evolved over time. It started from the Environmental Law Counseling Center of the Korean Anti-Pollution Movement Association (KAPMA), the predecessor of KFEM, in April 1991. It then became the Legal Advice Office of KFEM in 1993. It was the Environmental Law Committee in 1997, before finally becoming an affiliated organization of KFEM on 21 February 2000. The center is the first environmental group in Korea to have a lawyer working as a full-time member of the staff. More than 100 lawyers participate in activities of the ELC as directors, steering committee, and members.

The major activities of the ELC are:

- supporting environment related lawsuits
- improving environment related laws and regulations
- legal advice to members
- legal consulting on environmental issues
- developing programs for lawyers and experts

=== ECO Cooperative ===
The Eco Cooperative was started on 17 October 2002 to help address future environmental issues threatening health and living environment. The cooperative is working for an eco-friendly society where everyone can live in good health by respecting living things, and growing safe and healthy food. In order to supply safe food and build trust between producers and consumers, the Eco Cooperative promotes the development and sale of eco-friendly goods by enhancing their production and use. It sells products through an internet shopping site. Additionally, local cooperatives have been established at KFEM branches in local areas, such as KFEM's Seoul branch.

=== Korea Environmental Education Center (KEEC) ===
The Korea Environmental Education Center (KEEC) was established in January 2000 to develop education programs for citizens at all levels. The KEEC is involved in diverse activities to systemize environment related education, and to help environmental group leaders and environmental activists learn the importance and necessity of environmental education.

The major activities of KEEC are:

- Researching the systemization of environmental education
- Developing and distributing education materials and tools
- Developing and providing environmental programs for people of all ages and educators
- Advising on effective environmental education development
- Forming a network for environmental education
- Evaluating environmental education related policies and recommending education policies

=== Ham-ke-sa-neun-gil ===
Hamkesaneungil means "The way to live together" in English. The magazine, launched in July 1993 and published monthly, aims to raise environmental awareness in Korean society. Articles frequently advocate for environmental activities that promote coexistence of ecosystem and human beings, as well as social activities its publishers believe will encourage a happy and healthy civil society.

== See also ==
- Green Party Korea
