= King of the Ring (disambiguation) =

King of the Ring is a WWE professional wrestling pay-per-view

King of the Ring may also refer to:

- King of the Ring tournament, the professional wrestling tournament itself for which the pay-per-view was named after
  - WWF King of the Ring (video game)
- Ring Ka King, India professional wrestling tournament
- King in the Ring, New Zealand professional kick-boxing tournament
- King of the Ring, a title for a car with the fastest lap time on the Nürburgring Nordschleife
