= Priatelia Zeme Slovensko =

== General Facts ==
Priatelia Zeme Slovensko (Slovak, translated to English as Friends of the Earth Slovakia) became a Friends of the Earth International member in 1997. Since then, they have been actively participating in activities coordinated by Friends of the Earth International and its regional association, Friends of the Earth Europe.

Friends of the Earth - Slovakia consists of two organisations at present: Friends of the Earth-CEPA and Friends of the Earth - SPZ.

== Objective ==
Ensure environmental, social and economical justice as well as protection of nature, living environment and the quality of life.
