= Mose Auimatagi Jnr =

New Zealand Professional boxer of Samoan heritage

- Born: Mose Junior Auimatagi; 28 April 1995; Auckland, New Zealand
- Other names: Iron
- Nationality: New Zealand
- Weight: 80.7 kg (178 lb; 12 st 10 lb)
- Division: Super middleweight, middleweight
- Stance: Orthodox
- Team: Papatoetoe Boxing Club
- Trainer: Grant Arkell
- Years active: 2014 - present

Professional boxing record
- Total: 22
- Wins: 16
- By knockout: 11
- Losses: 4
- By knockout: 2
- Draws: 2

Other information
- Occupation: Professional boxer
- Children: 1
- Notable school: De La Salle College
- Boxing record from BoxRec

Mose Auimatagi Jnr (born 28 April 1995, in Auckland, New Zealand) is a New Zealand professional boxer of Samoan heritage.

== Boxing career ==
=== New Zealand and tournament champion 2014–2020 ===
Over the course of his career, Auimatagi has defeated many credible boxers, including Gunnar Jackson, Adrian Taihia, and Jordan Tai. He trains out of Papatoetoe Boxing Club with Grant Arkell, who trained Joseph Parker during his amateur fights, as his trainer and manager.

One of Auimatagi's biggest wins of his career was against Morgan Jones. In the last round of that bout, Auimatagi was knocked down early in the round. However, he returned and TKO'd his opponent with only 8 seconds left in the fight.

On 15 June 2019, Auimatagi took on the Australian, Kerry Foley, for the Interim WBA Oceania, World Boxing Council (WBC), and OPBF Silver Super Middleweight titles. Auimatagi won the fight by sixth-round Knockout, winning his fifth and sixth professional boxing titles. In February 2020, Auimatagi took on Ilias Achergui in hopes of getting signed by boxing promoter Dean Lonergan. Auimatagi won the fight by Unanimous Decision. On 19 December 2020, Auimatagi would jump up two weight divisions to take on David Light for the World Boxing Organization (WBO) Oriental Cruiserweight title. Light would win the fight by Unanimous Decision, giving Auimatagi his first loss in four years.

=== Return to boxing 2022–present ===
After a two-year hiatus, Auimatagi will return to the ring in December 2022, fighting in Dubai. He has been training for 12 weeks before it was announced on the 12th of November on his Facebook page.

== Professional titles ==
- New Zealand National Boxing Federation
  - 2016 New Zealand National middleweight title (158¼ lbs)
- New Zealand Professional Boxing Association
  - 2016 New Zealand National middleweight title (159¾ lbs)
- Universal Boxing Federation
  - 2016 Asia Pacific middleweight title (159¾ lbs)
- King in the Ring
  - The Force super middleweight title (168 lbs)
- World Boxing Council
  - 2019 OPBF Silver super middleweight title (167½ lbs)
- World Boxing Association
  - 2019 Interim Oceania super middleweight title (167½ lbs)
  - 2019 East/West Oceania Super Middleweight title (167½ lbs)

== Professional boxing record ==
22 fights	16 wins	4 losses
By knockout	11	2
By decision	5	2
Draws	2	

No.	Result	Record	Opponent	Type	Round, time	Date	Location	Notes
22	Loss	16–4–2	(Northern Ireland) (Australia) Conor Wallace	TKO	6 (8), 1:14	20 Dec 2023	Fortitude Music Hall, Fortitude Valley, Queensland, Australia	
21	Win	16–3–2	(New Zealand) (Australia) Mike Letoi	KO	1(6)	9 Sep 2023	Burleigh Bazaar, Queensland, Australia	
20	Loss	15–3–2	(New Zealand) (United Kingdom) Jerome Pampellone	TKO	1(10)	27 Apr 2023	Eventfinda Stadium, Auckland, New Zealand	For IBF Australasian light heavyweight title and WBO Asia-Pacific light heavyweight title
19	Win	15–2–2	(Fiji) Eroni Ligaloa	TKO	1(4)	18 Feb 2023	Gold Coast Croatian Sports Centre, Queensland, Australia	
18	Loss	14–2–2	(New Zealand) David Light	UD	10	19 Dec 2020	ABA Stadium, Auckland, New Zealand	For WBO Oriental cruiserweight title
17	Win	14–1–2	(Belgium) Ilias Achergui	UD	8	29 Feb 2020	St Kilda Town Hall, Melbourne, Australia	
16	Win	13–1–2	(Australia) Kerry Foley	KO	6 (10), 1:23	15 Jun 2019	Seagulls Club, Tweed Heads, Australia	Won vacant OPBF Silver, Interim WBA Oceania, & WBA Oceania East/West super middleweight title
15	Win	12–1–2	(New Zealand) Ratu Dawai	TKO	4 (6), 1:51	18 May 2019	ABA Stadium, Auckland, New Zealand	
14	Win	11–1–2	(New Zealand) Junior Tapuni	TKO	2 (4), 1:31	29 Sep 2018	ABA Stadium, Auckland, New Zealand	
13	Win	10–1–2	(United Kingdom) Morgan Jones	TKO	6 (6), 2:52	31 Mar 2018	(United Kingdom) Principality Stadium, Cardiff, Wales	
12	Win	9–1–2	(New Zealand) Jordan Tai	UD	3	7 Apr 2017	ASB Stadium, Auckland, New Zealand	
11	Win	8–1–2	(New Zealand) Ivana Siau	UD	3	7 Apr 2017	ASB Stadium, Auckland, New Zealand	
10	Win	7–1–2	(New Zealand) Adrian Taihia	TKO	3 (4), 1:14	18 Mar 2017	ABA Stadium, Auckland, New Zealand	
9	Win	6–1–2	(New Zealand) Sika Ulunga	TKO	4 (4), 1:06	17 Dec 2016	AMI Netball Centre, Auckland, New Zealand	
8	Win	5–1–2	(New Zealand) Pumipi Ngaronoa	UD	4	12 Nov 2016	AMI Netball Centre, Auckland, New Zealand	
7	Win	4–1–2	(New Zealand) Gunnar Jackson	MD	10	1 Jul 2016	ASB Stadium, Auckland, New Zealand	Won NZNPBA middleweight title
6	Win	3–1–2	(Australia) Reagan Dessaix	TKO	1 (6), 1:30	4 Jun 2016	Mansfield Tavern, Brisbane, Australia	
5	Win	2–1–2	(New Zealand) Ivana Siau	KO	4 (10)	29 Apr 2016	ABA Stadium, Auckland, New Zealand	Won NZNBF middleweight title
4	Loss	1–1–2	(New Zealand) Jordan Tai	UD	6	6 Nov 2015	ABA Stadium, Auckland, New Zealand	
3	Draw	1–0–2	(New Zealand) Panuve Helu	MD	4	14 Aug 2015	North Shore Cosmopolitan Club, Auckland, New Zealand	
2	Draw	1–0–1	(New Zealand) John Leighton	SD	4	24 Apr 2015	North Shore Events Centre, Auckland, New Zealand	
1	Win	1–0	(New Zealand) Jody Allen	TKO	1 (4), 1:18	5 Jul 2014	Vodafone Events Centre, Auckland, New Zealand	

== Awards and recognitions ==
- 2019 Gladrap Boxing Awards Boxer of the year (Nominated)
- 2019 Gladrap Boxing Awards Male boxer of the year (Nominated)
- 2019 Gladrap Boxing Awards Knockout of the year (Nominated)
- 2019 Gladrap Boxing Awards Champion of the year (Nominated)
