= Gentiane Lupi =

New Zealand boxer, actor and stuntwoman (born 1975)

- Born: Gentiane Lupi; 26 October 1975 (age 51); Wellington, New Zealand
- Nationality: New Zealand
- Height: 170 cm (5 ft 7 in)
- Weight: 55.1 kg (121 lb; 8 st 9 lb)
- Division: Super Bantamweight
- Team: Alpha Muay Thai
- Years active: 2013–present

Professional boxing record
- Total: 11
- Wins: 7
- By knockout: 4
- Losses: 3
- By knockout: 1
- Draws: 1

Kickboxing record
- Total: 23
- Wins: 19
- By knockout: 4
- Losses: 4

Mixed martial arts record
- Total: 2
- Wins: 1
- By knockout: 1
- Losses: 1
- By decision: 1

Other information
- Occupation: Professional boxing, kickboxing, MMA, Muay Thai
- Children: 3
- Boxing record from BoxRec
- Mixed martial arts record from Sherdog
- Last updated on: 28 January 2017

Gentiane Lupi (born 26 October 1975, Wellington, New Zealand) is a New Zealand professional boxer, kickboxer, MMA and Muay Thai fighter. She is the former Women's International Boxing Association World super bantamweight champion and the third New Zealand born person to have held a world boxing title.

Since debuting in 2013, she has won seven titles in all fighting styles including a boxing world title. In 2016, she stated she has been training with MTI Wellington for nearly three years.

Lupi has starred in films including Eagle vs Shark, Kombi Nation, Second Hand Wedding and Krampus, as well as the TV series Nothing Trivial.

== Filmography ==
Year	Title	Role	Notes
2002	Lovebites	Clare Grainger	New Zealand TV series, 26 episodes
2003	Kombi Nation	Sal	Also writer
2003	The Lord of the Rings: The Return of the King	Production runner (non-acting role)	Miniature unit
2007	Eagle vs Shark	Tracy	
2008	Second Hand Wedding	Daniela	
2015	Krampus	(non-acting role)	Lead stunts

== Combat titles ==
=== Kickboxing ===
- Tournament
  - Four Women King in the Ring Tournament winner (2014)
  - Four Women Adrenaline Tournament winner (2014)
- World Mauy Thai Council
  - WMC New Zealand Welterweight Title (2014)
  - WMC New Zealand Light Welterweight Title (2016)
- World Kickboxing Federation
  - WKBF New Zealand Middleweight Title (2015)
  - WKBF New Zealand Light Welterweight Title (2016)
  - WKBF World Featherweight Title (2017)

=== Boxing ===
- New Zealand Professional Boxing Association
  - NZPBA Women's Lightweight Title (2014)
- Women's International Boxing Association
  - WIBA World Super Bantamweight Title
- World Boxing Association
  - WBA Oceania Super Featherweight Title (2016)

== Professional MMA record ==
1 Wins (1 knockouts, 0 decisions, 0 submissions), 1 loss (0 knockouts, 1 decision, 0 submissions), 0 draws
Res.	Record	Opponent	Type	Rd., time	Date	Location	Notes
Lose	1–1	(New Zealand) Hera Tha Nytmere			2015-05-30	ABA Stadium, Auckland, New Zealand	Quarter Finals Women's MMA Tournament
Win	1–0	(New Zealand) Alex Sorthis	TKO	1	2014-11-29	ABA Stadium, Auckland, New Zealand	

== Professional kickboxing/Muay Thai record ==
19 wins, 4 losses, 0 draws
Res.	Record	Opponent	Type	Rd., time	Date	Location	Notes
Win	19–4	Demi McNamara	SD	5	2017-07-22	Te Rauparaha Arena, Wellington, New Zealand	WKBF World female featherweight title
Lose	18–4	Lucy Payne	UD	5	2016-11-26	St Kilda Town Hall, St Kilda, Victoria, Australia	
Win	18–3	Katie Quick	SD		2016-09-24	Te Rauparaha Arena, Porirua, New Zealand	Vacant WMC New Zealand Light Welterweight Title
Win	17–3	Desiree Maaka	UD		2016-07-10	Te Rauparaha Arena, Porirua, New Zealand	WKBF New Zealand Light Welterweight Title
Win	16–3	Missy Elliot			2015-07-18	Indian Cultural Centre, Wellington, New Zealand	WKBF New Zealand Middleweight Title
Lose	15–3	Daria Smith					
Win	15–2	Natalier Teller	SD		2015-06-19	Te Rauparaha Arena, Porirua, New Zealand	
Lose	14–2	Carleigh Crawford					
Win	14–1	Natalier Teller	UD		2014-11-15	Wellington, New Zealand	NZWMC Welterweight Title
Win	13–1	Emma Graham			2014-10-18	Indian Cultural Centre, Wellington, New Zealand	
Win	12–1	Alicia Pestana	UD	5	2014-08-23	Wellington, New Zealand	Pestana is a three time Women's World Kickboxing Champion
Win	11–1	Daria Smith	UD	3	2014-08-09	Feilding, New Zealand	4 Women Adrenaline Tournament Finals
Win	10–1	Baby Nansen	UD	3	2014-08-09	Feilding, New Zealand	4 Women Adrenaline Tournament Semi Finals
Win	9–1	Tui Pirikahu	UD		2014-07-05	Te Rauparaha Arena, Porirua, New Zealand	NZWMC Welterweight Title
Win	8–1	Rochelle Stroh	KO	2nd	2014-04-12	ABA Stadium, Auckland, New Zealand	4 Women King in the Ring Finals
Win	7–1	Amy Vaughen	UD		2014-04-12	ABA Stadium, Auckland, New Zealand	4 Women King in the Ring Semi Finals
Lose	6–1	Baby Nansen	SD		2014-02-22	Te Rauparaha Arena, Porirua, New Zealand	
Win	6–0	Beathe Kornelison			2013		
Win	5–0	Rose Te Hau			2013		
Win	4–0	Ari MacDonald	KO		2013		
Win	3–0	Jo LoFroth	KO		2013		
Win	2–0	Bridget Lord			2013		
Win	1–0	Ramona Sargent			2013		

== Professional boxing record ==
11 fights	7 wins	3 losses
By knockout	4	1
By decision	3	2
Draws	1	

Res.	Record	Opponent	Type	Rd., time	Date	Location	Notes
Win	7-3-1	(New Zealand) Ariane Nicholson	TKO	3, (6)	2021-05-15	Memorial Hall QE ll, Tauranga, New Zealand	
Win	6-3-1	(New Zealand) Karen Te Ruki Pasene	SD	4	2019-10-04	Sky City Convention Centre, Auckland, New Zealand	
Win	5-3-1	(Singapore) Nurshahidah Roslie	TKO	5, (10)	2016-11-12	Foochow Building, Singapore	vacant WBA Oceania Women's super featherweight title
Lose	4-3-1	(Australia) Deanha Hobbs	TKO	3, (4) 0:46	2016-09-10	Mansfield Tavern, Mansfield, Queensland, Australia	
Lose	4-2-1	(United States) Ronica Jeffrey	UD	10	2016-04-16	The Trusts Arena, Auckland, New Zealand	vacant WBC Silver female featherweight title
Win	4-1-1	(Thailand) Anrey Onesongchaigym	TKO	6, (10) 1:03	2015-05-09	Indian Cultural Centre, Wellington, New Zealand	interim Women's International Boxing Association World super bantamweight title Late September 2015 the WIBA Promoted Lupi to full World Champion
Win	3-1-1	(New Zealand) Baby Nansen	MD	6	2015-02-28	Te Rauparaha Arena, Porirua, New Zealand	
Win	2-1-1	(New Zealand) Daniella Smith	TKO	5, (10) 1:45	2014-12-13	ABA Stadium, Auckland, New Zealand	Vacant NZPBA Women's lightweight title Smith Retired after this fight
Win	1-1-1	(New Zealand) Daniella Smith	MD	6	2014-06-27	ABA Stadium, Auckland, New Zealand	Smith is the first IBF Women's World champion and the second New Zealand born World Boxing Champion
Draw	0-1-1	(Australia) Leighann Banham	TD	3, (6)	2014-06-21	Hastings Sports Centre, Hastings, New Zealand	Fight was stopped when Banham accidentally Headbutted Lupi and couldn't continue. Fight was ruled a Technical Draw as it had not gone past 4 rounds. All 3 Judges scored 20–18 for Lupi. Banham had just been dropped and given an 8 count prior to the accidental headbutt
Lose	0–1	(Australia) Shannon O'Connell	MD	6	2014-05-17	PCYC, Nerang, Queensland, Australia	

== Awards and recognitions ==
- 2019 Gladrap Boxing Awards Female Boxer of the Year (nominated)
- 2019 Gladrap Boxing Awards Returning Boxer of the Year (nominated)

Vacant	NZPBA lightweight Title; 13 December 2014 - present	Incumbent
Vacant	Interim WIBA World Super Bantamweight; Title; 9 May 2015–1 October 2015	Promoted
Vacant Title last held by Shannon O'Connell; Stripped	WIBA World Super Bantamweight; Title; 1 October 2015–16 April 2016	Stripped
Vacant	WBA Oceania Super Featherweight; Title; 12 November 2016 - present	Incumbent
