= Baby Nansen =

New Zealand boxer (born 1987)

- Born: Birthony Katarina Nansen; 11 January 1987 (age 39); Auckland, New Zealand
- Nationality: New Zealander
- Weight: 56.4 kg (124 lb; 8 st 12 lb)
- Division: Lightweight; Super Featherweight; Featherweight
- Style: Boxing; Kickboxing
- Stance: Orthodox
- Team: Smac Gym (kickboxing); CKB (boxing)
- Trainer: Doug Viney

Professional boxing record
- Total: 15
- Wins: 9
- By knockout: 1
- Losses: 5
- Draws: 1

Kickboxing record
- Total: 39
- Wins: 24
- Losses: 13
- Draws: 2

Mixed martial arts record
- Total: 1
- Wins: 1
- By decision: 1
- Losses: 0

Other information
- Notable relatives: Antz Nansen; Ray Sefo
- Boxing record from BoxRec
- Last updated on: 21 May 2017

Birthony Katarina Nansen (born 11 January 1987), better known as Baby Nansen, is a New Zealand professional boxer and kickboxer. Nansen's biggest fight of her career was against Melissa St. Vil for the vacant WBC Silver female super featherweight title on the Kali Reis vs. Maricela Cornejo undercard. Despite losing the bout, she fought very well and received a WBC ranking of 39th. Nansen has fought on a King in the Ring undercard.

== Vs Jennings ==
In 2016, Nansen was appointed as the number one contender for the New Zealand National (NZPBA Version) Super Featherweight Title, which was then held by Rebecca Jennings. The two fought each other in May 2017 for the NZPBA title with the winner originally being Nansen by Split Decision. Shortly after the bout, Nansen's camp was approached by the officiating supervisor and it was revealed the scorecard calculations were added up incorrectly. Nansen was stripped of the title immediately and the result was changed to a draw from the right calculations.

== Madison Square Garden ==
In May 2018, Baby Nansen fought at the world-famous venue at Madison Square Garden. She took on undefeated boxer Mikaela Mayer who later in her career lead to winning the World title. Baby Nansen lost the fight by Unanimous Decision. Baby Nansen was the first New Zealand female boxer to have fought at the venue and the first New Zealander in 11 years since Kali Meehan fought DaVarryl Williamson.

== Controversy ==
On 10 August 2021, Baby Nansen was in the corner for a fighter that she coached at her kickboxing gym. When her fight was lost by contentious points decision, Nansen confronted one of the judges, and then punched him. A week later, a video of the altercation was published by news media. Nansen apologised to the official and the sanctioning body, which accepted the apology after lengthy conversations and suspended her from its events for 12 months. Nansen also stepped down from her gym. City Kickboxing, the gym that Nansen trained at professionally, cancelled a bout she was to compete in and indefinitely suspended her. City Kickboxing took the action in light of the recent death of fighter Fau Vake, who trained at the gym and died after being on life support for over a week after being blindsided and receiving a coward punch outside a night club in Auckland.

== Combat titles won ==
=== Kickboxing titles ===
- WMC New Zealand Featherweight Title
- ISKA South Pacific Featherweight Title
- WMC New Zealand Amateur Lightweight Title
- WMC New Zealand Amateur Featherweight Title
- WMC New Zealand Junior Amateur Lightweight Title

=== Boxing ===
- New Zealand National (PBCNZ version) Super Lightweight Title
- South Pacific (PBCNZ version) Super Lightweight Title

== Professional boxing record ==
15 fights	9 wins	5 losses
By knockout	1	0
By decision	8	5
Draws	1	

No.	Result	Record	Opponent	Type	Round, time	Date	Location	Notes
15	Lose	9–5–1	(New Zealand) Mea Motu	UD	8	30 Apr 2022	ABA Stadium, Auckland, New Zealand	vacant New Zealand PBCNZ Super Featherweight title
14	Win	9–4–1	(New Zealand) Karen Te Ruki Pasene	RTD	7 (8), 2:00	10 Oct 2020	Vodafone Events Centre, Manukau City, New Zealand	vacant South Pacific PBCNZ Super Lightweight title
13	Win	8–4–1	(New Zealand) Tania Reid	UD	4	25 May 2019	TSB Stadium, New Plymouth, New Zealand	3541 attendance record
12	Lose	7–4–1	(Australia) Deanha Hobbs	UD	8	15 December 2018	Convention & Exhibition Centre, Brisbane, Queensland, Australia	vacant WBO Asia Pacific Female super featherweight title
11	Win	7–3–1	(New Zealand) Quinita Hati	SD	4	18 August 2018	Kerikeri, New Zealand	
10	Lose	6–3–1	(United States) Mikaela Mayer	UD	6	12 May 2018	(United States) Madison Square Garden, New York, USA	
9	Win	6–2–1	(New Zealand) Quinita Hati	SD	8	1 September 2017	AMI Netball Centre, St Johns, Auckland, New Zealand	vacant New Zealand PBCNZ female super lightweight title
8	Draw	5–2–1	(New Zealand) Rebecca Jennings	SD	10	20 May 2017	Te Rauparaha Arena, Porirua, New Zealand	New Zealand NZPBA female super featherweight title
7	Win	5–2	(New Zealand) Wendy Talbot	UD	4	12 November 2016	AMI Netball Centre, St Johns, Auckland, New Zealand	
6	Win	4–2	(New Zealand) Briar Johnston	SD	4	28 October 2016	ASB Stadium, Kohimarama, Auckland, New Zealand	
5	Win	3–2	(Russia) Daria Smith	MD	4	8 October 2016	Manurewa Netball Centre, Manurewa, New Zealand	
4	Lose	2–2	(Haiti) Melissa St. Vil	UD	10	16 April 2016	The Trusts Arena, Auckland, New Zealand	Vacant WBC Silver female super featherweight title
3	Win	2–1	(Russia) Daria Smith	UD	4	5 September 2015	ABA Stadium, Auckland, New Zealand	World Boxing Federation World Title Eliminator
2	Lose	1–1	(New Zealand) Gentiane Lupi	MD	6	28 February 2015	Te Rauparaha Arena, Porirua, New Zealand	
1	Win	1–0	(New Zealand) Suzie Ketchley	UD	4	18 October 2014	AMI Netball North Harbour Stadium, Northcote, New Zealand	Professional debut

== Awards and recognitions ==
- 2019 Gladrap Boxing Awards Female boxer of the year (Nominated)
- 2019 Gladrap Boxing Awards Best looking female boxer of the year (Nominated)
- 2020 New Zealand Fighter Boxing Awards Knockout of the year (Won)
