= Green Party of Indonesia =

Green Party of Indonesia Partai Hijau Indonesia
- Abbreviation: PHI
- Chairman: Nur Rosyid Murtadho
- Secretary: Rika Febriyani
- Founded: 5 June 2012; 14 years ago
- Headquarters: Jl. Tebet Barat Dalam Raya No. 80, Jakarta
- Membership: 1,086
- Ideology: Pancasila; Green politics Eco-socialism
- Political position: Centre-left
- Regional affiliation: Asia Pacific Greens Federation (Associate)
- International affiliation: Global Greens (Observer)

Website
- www.partaihijau.org

The Green Party of Indonesia (Indonesian: Partai Hijau Indonesia, PHI) is a political party in Indonesia founded in 2012. The party follows green politics, and has close ties to The Indonesian Forum for Environment.

The Green Party of Indonesia has members in all 34 provinces. The party aimed to have been registered for the 2019 Indonesian general election, however, they did not reach registration in time and instead endorsed independents or members of other parties. The party seeks to be registered by 2021.

The Green Party of Indonesia has been supported by the Australian Greens as a part of the "Australian Political Parties for Democracy Program".

== Leadership ==
Leadership as of 30 June 2024:

Position	Name
Chairman	Nur Rosyid Murtadho
Secretary	Rika Febriyani
Treasurer	Erwin Febrian Syuhada
Coordinator for Ideology and Cadres Affairs	Miftachul Choir; Elly Bin Yahya
Coordinator for Public-Policy Affairs	Diemas Sukma Hawkins
Coordinator for Election Strategy Affairs	Dimitri Dwi Putra
Coordinator for Protection Of Vulnerable And Marginalized Groups Affairs	Wahyu Bawono Arum Aji
Coordinator for Economic Independence Affairs	Tahita Dewangga
Coordinator for Agitation and Propaganda Affairs	Benicio Maesa Gorga
Coordinator for Regional Development and Party's Wing Affairs	Juli Ermiansyah Putra

== Leaders ==
No.	Name (Lifespan)	Portrait	Constituency / title	Term of office		Election results
No.	Name (Lifespan)	Portrait	Constituency / title	Took office	Left office	Election results
National Presidium of the Green Party of Indonesia (2021–2024)
–	Dimitri Dwi Putra		—	7 March 2021	30 June 2024	
–	Kristina Viri		—	7 March 2021	30 June 2024	
–	Nur Rosyid Murtadho		—	7 March 2021	30 June 2024	
–	Taibah Istiqomah		—	7 March 2021	30 June 2024	
Chairman of the Green Party of Indonesia (2024–Present)
1	Nur Rosyid Murtadho		—	30 June 2024	Incumbent	2024 Unopposed
