= The Indonesian Forum for Environment =

Environmental advocacy organization

The Indonesian Forum for Living Environment (Wahana Lingkungan Hidup Indonesia, WALHI) is an Indonesian environmental non-governmental organization, which is part of the Friends of the Earth International (FoEI) network.

WALHI was founded in 1980 and joined FoEI in 1989. WALHI is the largest and oldest environmental advocacy NGO in Indonesia. WALHI unites more than 479 NGO's and 156 individuals throughout Indonesia's vast archipelago, with independent offices and grassroot constituencies located in 27 of the nation's 31 provinces. Its newsletter is published in both English and Indonesian. WALHI works on a wide range of issues, including agrarian conflict over access to natural resources, indigenous rights and peasants, coastal and marine, and deforestation. WALHI also has several cross cutting issues such as climate change, women and disaster risk management.

Its scope is broader than just environmental concerns: "It stands for social transformation, peoples sovereignty, and sustainability of life and livelihoods." The website also reports that WALHI volunteers assisted after the 2006 Yogyakarta earthquake in Yogyakarta.

The forum is currently involved in the formation of the Indonesian Green Party.
