= Men's K-1 at WAKO World Championships 2007 Belgrade -75 kg =

Kickboxing tournament

The men's middleweight (75 kg/165 lbs) K-1 category at the W.A.K.O. World Championships 2007 in Belgrade was the fifth heaviest of the K-1 tournaments, involving seventeen fighters all based in Europe. Each of the matches was three rounds of two minutes each and were fought under K-1 rules.

As there were too few contestants for a thirty-two man tournament, fifteen of the fighters received a bye through to the second round. The tournament champion was Belarusian Yury Harbachou who defeated Frenchman Kamel Metzani in the final to win gold. Defeated semi finalists Macedonian Ile Risteski and José Reis from Portugal won bronze.

== Results ==
1st Round
(Estonia) Maksim Vorovski	WIN
(Bosnia and Herzegovina) Arif Mulalic

2nd Round
(France) Kamel Metzani	WIN
(Hungary) Daniel Nedreu
(Croatia) Mario Agatic
(Spain) Israel Palomeque	WIN
(Russia) Dmitriy Shutkin	WIN
(Azerbaijan) Nahid Asadov
(North Macedonia) Ile Risteski	WIN
(Serbia) Nikola Petrovic
(Bulgaria) Krasimir Aprostolov
(Portugal) José Reis	WIN
(Slovakia) Vladimir Konsky	WIN
(Estonia) Maksim Vorovski
(Ukraine) Ivan Zinchenko
(Poland) Artur Szychowski	WIN
(Italy) Luca Fei
(Belarus) Yury Harbachou	WIN

Quarter Finals
(France) Kamel Metzani	WIN
(Spain) Israel Palomeque
(Russia) Dmitriy Shutkin
(North Macedonia) Ile Risteski	WIN
(Portugal) José Reis	WIN
(Slovakia) Vladimir Konsky
(Poland) Artur Szychowski
(Belarus) Yury Harbachou	WIN

Semi Finals
(France) Kamel Metzani	WIN
(North Macedonia) Ile Risteski
(Portugal) José Reis
(Belarus) Yury Harbachou	WIN

Final
(France) Kamel Metzani
(Belarus) Yury Harbachou	WIN

== See also ==
- List of WAKO Amateur World Championships
- List of WAKO Amateur European Championships
- List of male kickboxers
