= Friends of the Earth =

International network of environmental organizations

Friends of the Earth International
- Abbreviation: FoEI
- Formation: 1969 (57 years ago)
- Founder: Donald Aitken; David Brower; Jerry Mander; Gary Soucie
- Purpose: Environmentalism; Anti-nuclear movement; Human rights
- Region served: Global
- Members: 75 national member groups
- Key people: Karin Nansen; Jagoda Munić; Hemantha Withanage (chair); Choony Kim; Asad Rehman; Godwin Uyi Ojo; Kwami Dodzi Kpondzo; Silvia Quiroa
- Volunteers: Some 5,000 local activist groups
- Website: www.foei.org

Friends of the Earth International (FoEI) is an international network of grassroots environmental organizations in 73 countries. About half of the member groups call themselves "Friends of the Earth" in their own languages; the others use other names. The organization was founded in 1969 in San Francisco by David Brower, Donald Aitken, and Gary Soucie after Brower's split with the Sierra Club because of his opposition to the Diablo Canyon nuclear plant. They received funding from Robert O. Anderson, founder of the ARCO petroleum company. It became an international network of organizations in 1971 with a meeting of representatives from four countries: United States, Sweden, the UK and France.

FoEI currently has a secretariat, based in Amsterdam, Netherlands, which provides support for the network and its agreed major campaigns. The executive committee of elected representatives from national groups sets policy and oversees the work of the secretariat. In 2016, Uruguayan activist Karin Nansen was elected to serve as chair of the organization. Sri Lankan activist Hemantha Withanage has served as chair of FoEI since 2021.

== Campaign issues ==
Friends of the Earth International is an international membership organisation, with members spread across the world. Its advocacy programs focus on environmental, economic and social issues, highlighting their political and human rights contexts.

As per its website, the current campaign priorities of Friends of the Earth International are: economic justice and resisting neoliberalism; forests and biodiversity; food sovereignty; and climate justice and energy. The campaign priorities of FOEI are set at its bi-annual general meeting. Additionally, FOEI also plans campaigns in other fields, such as waste and overconsumption, international financial institutions, ecological debt, mining and extractive industries, and opposition to nuclear power. FOEI has campaigned for the closure of the Diablo Canyon nuclear plant in California. FOEI also supports campaigns from the regions or member groups, such as the one on the consumption and intensive production of meat (Meat Atlas) by Friends of the Earth Europe.

FOEI claims that it has been successful as it has eliminated billions in taxpayer subsidies to corporate polluters, reformed the World Bank to address environmental and human rights concerns, pushed the debate on global warming to pressure the U.S. and U.K. to attempt the best legislation possible, stopped more than 150 destructive dams and water projects worldwide, pressed and won landmark regulations of strip mines and oil tankers and banned international whaling. Its critics claim that the organization tries only to obtain media attention (as by releasing the song "Love Song to the Earth"), but does not stay with locals to actually solve complicated problems, and that it prevents development in developing countries. They have also been critical of its policy to accept high levels of funding from companies and charities related to oil and gas.

One of Friends of the Earth's most recent campaigns and legal battles was the "Shell Case", led by Milieudefensie (Friends of the Earth Netherlands). In 2021, a court in the Netherlands ruled in a landmark case that the oil giant Shell must reduce its emissions in 2030 by 45% compared to 2019 levels. This was the first time that a company had been legally obliged to align its policies with the Paris Agreement. This was later overturned in November 2024.

In January 2025 when UK Prime Minister Keir Starmer announced plans to take on NIMBYs who block major infrastructure projects, such as nuclear power, roads, railway and wind farms, Friends of the Earth criticized Starmer, saying he was scapegoating people with "valid concerns about a project's impact".

== Structure of the network ==
The member organization in a particular country may name itself Friends of the Earth or an equivalent translated phrase in the national language, e.g., Friends of the Earth (US), Friends of the Earth (EWNI) (England Wales and Northern Ireland), Amigos de la Tierra (Spain and Argentina). However, roughly half of the member groups work under their own names, sometimes reflecting an independent origin and subsequent accession to the network, such as Pro Natura (Switzerland), the Korean Federation for Environmental Movement, Environmental Rights Action (FOE Nigeria) and WALHI (FOE Indonesia).

Friends of the Earth International (FoEI) is supported by a secretariat based in Amsterdam, and an executive committee known as ExCom. The ExCom is elected by all member groups at a general meeting held every two years, and it is the ExCom which employs the secretariat. At the same general meeting, overall policies and priority activities are agreed.

In addition to work which is coordinated at the FoEI level, national member groups are free to carry out their own campaigns and to work bi- or multi-laterally as they see fit, as long as this does not go against agreed policy at the international level.

== Publications ==
The Meat Atlas is an annual report on the methods and impact of industrial animal agriculture. The publication consists of 27 short essays and, with the help of graphs, visualises facts about the production and consumption of meat. The Meat Atlas is jointly published by Friends of the Earth and Heinrich Böll Foundation.

== Notable supporters ==
- Rock musician George Harrison became associated with Friends of the Earth after attending their anti-nuclear demonstrations in London in 1980. He dedicated his 1989 greatest hits album, Best of Dark Horse, to Friends of the Earth, among other environmental organisations.
- Jay Kay, frontman of the funk and acid jazz group Jamiroquai, is known for donating a part of the profits earned from his album sales to Friends of the Earth and Oxfam, among other causes.
- Thom Yorke, lead singer of Radiohead, has publicly supported a number of Friends of the Earth campaigns, including the Big Ask, which led the UK government to introduce the Climate Change Bill in the Queen's Speech on 15 November 2006. This was after a claimed 200,000 people across the country had asked their MP to support such a bill.
- Proceeds from sales of the single "Love Song to the Earth" (2015), performed by Paul McCartney, Jon Bon Jovi, Sheryl Crow, Fergie, Sean Paul, and Colbie Caillat among others, went to Friends of the Earth U.S. and the United Nations Foundation.

== Member organizations ==
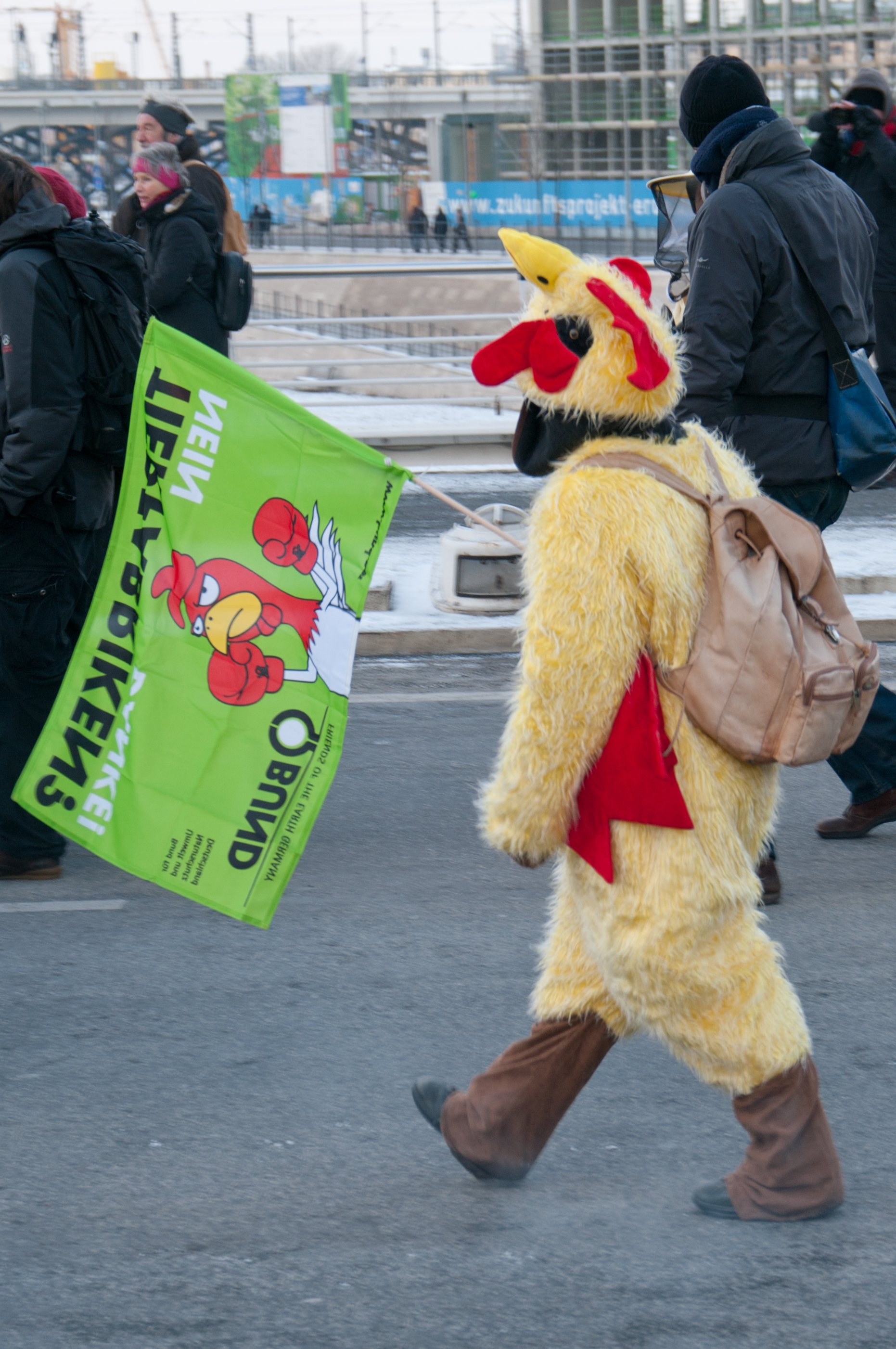
We are fed up!-protests: Friends of the Earth Germany is part of the coalition which organizes the demonstration.

=== Asia ===
- Friends of the Earth Japan
- Indonesian Forum for Environment, Indonesia
- Korean Federation for Environmental Movement
- Friends of the Earth Middle East
- Legal Rights and Natural Resources Center – Kasama sa Kalikasan
- Centre for Environmental Justice, Sri Lanka
- Sahabat Alam Malaysia

=== Europe ===
- Friends of the Earth Europe, Brussels
  - Young Friends of the Earth Europe, Brussels
  - Friends of the Earth – France
  - Friends of the Earth Scotland
  - Pro Natura (Switzerland)
  - Amigos de la tierra, Spain
  - Bund für Umwelt und Naturschutz Deutschland, Germany
  - Friends of the Earth (EWNI), England, Wales and Northern Ireland
  - Birmingham Friends of the Earth
  - GLOBAL 2000, Austria
  - Friends of the Earth Malta
  - Friends of the Earth Finland
  - Friends of the Earth Hungary
  - Priatelia Zeme Slovensko (Friends of the Earth Slovakia)
- Friends of the Earth (EWNI), (England, Wales and Northern Ireland)
  - Manchester Friends of the Earth
- Green Action, Croatia
- Hnutí DUHA, Czech Republic
- Milieudefensie, Netherlands
- Norwegian Society for the Conservation of Nature, Norway
- Friends of the Earth (Malta)
- NOAH, founded in 1969 in Denmark, national organisation of Foe since 1988, Denmark.

=== North America ===
- Friends of the Earth Canada
  - Les AmiEs de la Terre de Québec, Canada
- Friends of the Earth (US)

=== Oceania ===
- Friends of the Earth Australia

== See also ==
- Friends of the Earth, Inc. v. Laidlaw Environmental Services, Inc.
- List of environmental organizations
- Anti-nuclear movement in the United States
- List of anti-nuclear groups in the United States
- Friends of the Earth (HK)

== Bibliography ==
- Brian Doherty and Timothy Doyle, Environmentalism, Resistance and Solidarity. The Politics of Friends of the Earth International (Basingstoke: Palgrave, 2013). doi:10.1057/9781137316714
- Jan-Henrik Meyer, “'Where do we go from Wyhl?' Transnational Anti-Nuclear Protest targeting European and International Organisations in the 1970s,” Historical Social Research 39: 1 (2014): 212–235. "Where do we go from Wyhl?" Transnational anti-nuclear protest targeting European and international organizations in the 1970s
