= Souleimane Konaté =

French heavyweight kickboxer (born 1984)

Souleimane Konate
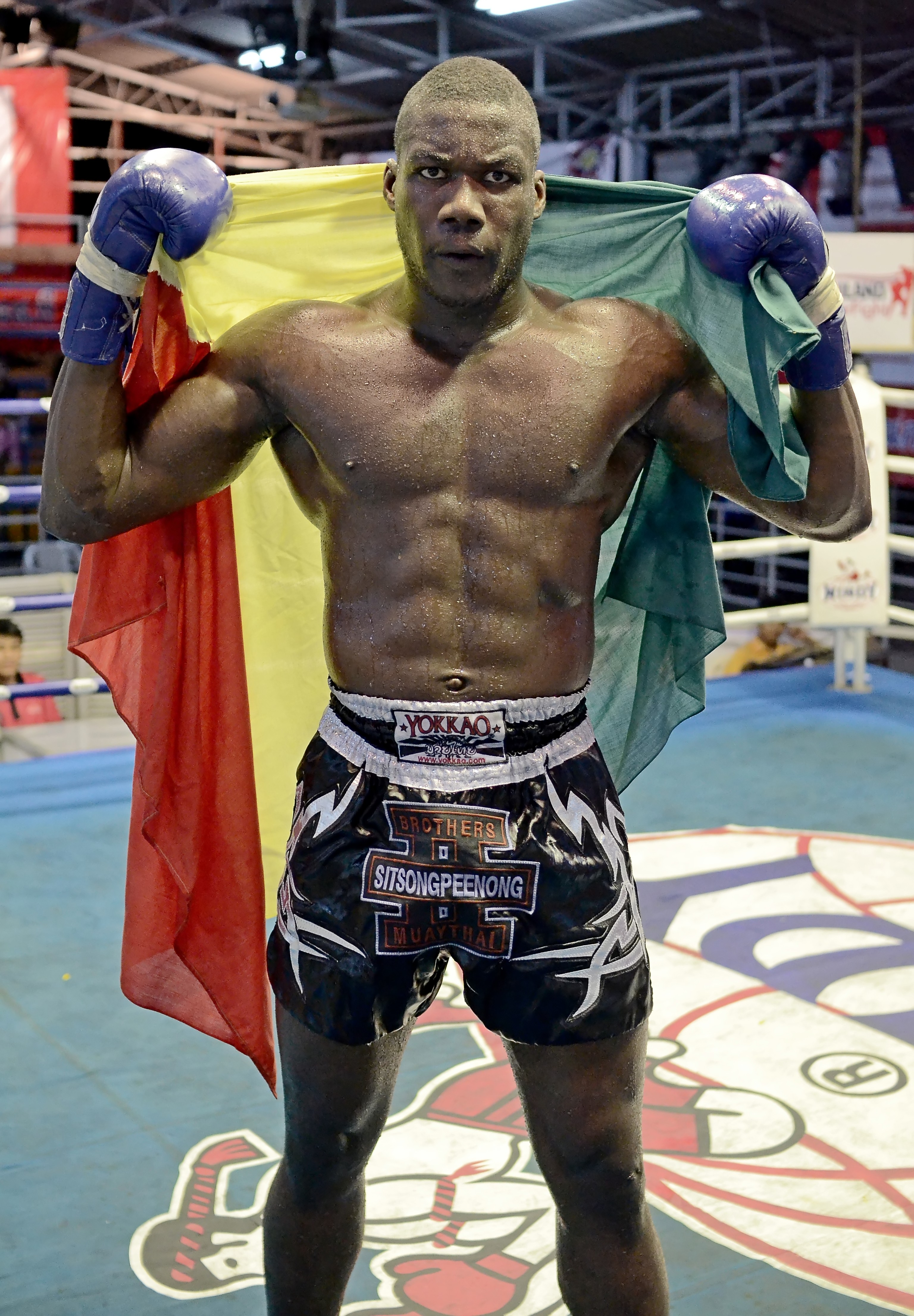
- Born: February 4, 1984 (age 42); Aulnay-sous-Bois, France
- Other names: Black Grizzly, Grizzly
- Nationality: (France) French
- Height: 1.91 m (6 ft 3 in)
- Weight: 227 lb (103 kg; 16.2 st)
- Division: Heavyweight
- Style: Kickboxing
- Stance: Orthodox
- Fighting out of: Villepinte, France
- Years active: 2005-2013

Kickboxing record
- Total: 25
- Wins: 18
- Losses: 7

Souleimane Konate (born February 4, 1984) is a French heavyweight kickboxer.

== Biography and career ==
Souleimane Konate joined Faucon Gym in 2005.

His first success in K-1 came on August 19, 2007 at K-1 2007 Hungary, when he defeated Ferencz József and Jánosi László and reached the tournament finals, where he was stopped by Dániel Török by unanimous decision.

On December 8, 2007 at K-1 World GP Final in Yokohama, Japan, Konaté was scheduled to fight on a Superfight against Musashi but was forced to pull out due to injuries and was replaced by David Dancrade.

== Titles ==
- 2012 K-1 rules French Cup Heavyweight Champion
- 2012 Kickboxing French Cup Heavyweight Champion
- 2007 K-1 Fighting Network Hungary runner up
- 2006 "Urban Trip" Full Contact tournament Champion, Montelimar, France
- 2006 Heavy Weights Academy “K-1 rules” Champion, Tournai, Belgium
- 2005 French Kickboxing Champion

== Kickboxing record ==
Date	Result	Opponent	Event	Location	Method	Round	Time
2013-07-04	Win	(Belgium) Yassine Boughanem	Thailand SuperFight Thepprasit	Pattaya, Thailand	Decision (unanimous)	5	3:00
2013-05-10	Loss	(France) Gaetan Sautron	French Muay Thai Championships Finals	Saint-Denis, Réunion	TKO (corner stoppage)	2	02:18
Fight was for FFSCDA French Heavyweight (+91kg/200lb) Thaiboxing Championship belt.
2013-03-16	Win	(France) Jeremy Damon	French K-1 rules Championships Semi Finals	L'Île-Rousse, Corsica	KO (right cross)	5	00:38
2012-12-02	Win	(France) Aissam Bouallem	French K-1 rules Cup	Évreux, France	TKO	3
Wins K-1 rules French Cup Heavyweight 2012 Title.
2012-10-28	Win	(France) Jerome Biancamaria	French Kickboxing Cup	Paris, France	Decision	3
Wins Kickboxing French Cup Heavyweight 2012 Title.
2010-11-20	Win	(New Zealand) Antz Nansen	Philip Lam Promotions "NZ vs Australia & France"	Auckland, New Zealand	Decision (unanimous)	5	3:00
2010-07-17	Win	(New Zealand) Daniel Tai	Philip Lam Promotions "NZ vs Australia & France"	Auckland, New Zealand	Decision (unanimous)	3	3:00
2009-11-21	Loss	(New Zealand) Daniel Tai	Philip Lam Promotions	Auckland, New Zealand	Ext. R. decision	4	3:00
2009-08-29	Loss	(New Zealand) Daniel Tai	Clash of the Norths	Whangārei, New Zealand	KO	2
2007-10-26	Win	(Czech Republic) Luboš Raušer	Klash III "Show no mercy"	Sibiu, Romania	Decision (unanimous)	3	3:00
2007-08-19	Loss	(Hungary) Dániel Török	K-1 Fighting Network Hungary 2007, Final	Debrecen, Hungary	Decision	3	3:00
Fight was for K-1 Fighting Network Hungary 2007 title.
2007-08-19	Win	(Hungary) Jánosi László	K-1 Fighting Network Hungary 2007, Semi Finals	Debrecen, Hungary	Decision	3	3:00
2007-08-19	Win	(Hungary) Ferencz József	K-1 Fighting Network Hungary 2007, Quarter Finals	Debrecen, Hungary	Decision	3	3:00
2007-02-24	Loss	(Albania) Rustemi Kreshnik	K-1 Rules Heavy Weights Academy 2007	Tournai, Belgium	TKO (doctor stoppage)
Fight was for WFCA Benelux Heavyweight (−95kg/209lb) Thaiboxing Championship.
2007-01-26	Win	(France) Jean Marrie Capdevilla	K-1 Rules Kick Tournament 2007 in Marseilles	Marseilles, France	KO (right high kick)	2
2006-12-16	Loss	(Czech Republic) Roman Kleibl	K-1 Fighting Network Prague Round '07, Reserve Fight	Prague, Czech Republic	TKO
2006-11-04	Win	(Lithuania) Giedrius Pranckevicius	K-1 Fighting Network Riga 2006	Riga, Latvia	Decision (split)	3	3:00
2006-08-18	Loss	(Belgium) Benjamin Petit	K-1 Hungary 2006	Debrecen, Hungary	Decision (split)
2006-05-20	Win	(France) Karl Dubus	Urban Trip Tournament 2006, Finals	Montélimar, France	Decision	3	3:00
Wins Urban Trip Tournament 2006 Title.
2006-05-20	Win	(Algeria) Farsi	Urban Trip Tournament 2006, Semi Finals	Montélimar, France	KO (right cross)	1	0:19
2006-02-25	Win	(Netherlands) Benjey Zimmerman	Heavy Weights Academy “K-1 rules” 2006, Final	Tournai, Belgium	Ext. R. decision	4	2:00
Wins Heavy Weights Academy “K-1 rules” 2006 Title.
2006-02-25	Win	(Belgium) Benjamin Petit	Heavy Weights Academy “K-1 rules” 2006, Semi Finals	Tournai, Belgium	Decision	3	2:00
