= Centre for Environmental Justice =

Non-governmental organization

- පරිසර යුක්ති කේන්ද්‍රය
- Abbreviation: CEJ
- Formation: 2004; 22 years ago
- Type: Non-governmental organisation
- Purpose: Environmental conservation Environmental Justice
- Headquarters: Colombo
- Location: Sri Lanka
- Methods: Awareness, Advocacy, Legal Aid, Litigation
- Key people: Hemantha Withanage, Ravindranath Dabare
- Website: ejustice.lk

Centre for Environmental Justice is an environmental conservation and public interest litigation organisation in Sri Lanka. The organisation is a member of the Friends of the Earth International network which is the world's largest international grassroots environmental network.

== Cases ==
=== Illegal waste exports ===
In 2019, the Centre for Environmental Justice filed for legal action to repatriate waste containers illegally exported to Sri Lanka from the UK. After a year-long case, the court ordered the illegal waste to be sent back to the UK. An agency was set up thereafter to investigate illegal waste exports.

=== Kallaru Forest Reserve case ===
The Centre for Environmental Justice filed a writ application in court against the illegal clearing of the Kallaru Forest Reserve, adjacent to the Wilpattu National Park and the construction of a housing project. In the winning judgement, the Court of Appeal in Sri Lanka for the first time exercised the 'polluter-pays-principle' under environmental law against the Minister responsible for the forest clearing, as opposed to administrative law remedies.

As a result, the cleared area was set to be reforested and is currently being replanted as per the judgement.

== Projects ==
In 2020, the Centre for Environmental Justice launched an app named "eJustice" where citizens can anonymously report environmental crimes in relation to forests and wetlands.

Advocacy includes calling on single-use plastic ban and protection of forests.

The organisation litigates for environmental justice.

The organisation conducts campaigns and programmes to address water sanitation issues, climate change impacts, waste management, environmental legal aid, right to environmental information, sustainable energy, food sovereignty, economic justice, forest governance, wetland protection, toxic chemicals, human and wildlife conflict, environmental research, environmental awareness and Environmental Impact Assessment training.

The organisation initiated a petition with other environmental groups to call for an end to the ongoing ecocide in Sri Lanka.

== See also ==
- Friends of the Earth International
