= Rustemi Kreshnik =

Belgian kickboxer (born 1984)

- Born: April 29, 1984 (age 42); Pejë, Kosovo, Yugoslavia (modern Kosovo)
- Nationality: Belgian
- Height: 1.87 m (6 ft 1 1/2 in)
- Weight: 108 kg (238 lb; 17.0 st)
- Division: Heavyweight
- Style: Kickboxing • Muay Thai --k1
- Fighting out of: Antwerp, Belgium
- Team: Team Celtix; Team Kreshnik
- Trainer: Peter Lamberts; Roger van Oudenhoven; Stefan Wellens
- Years active: 2003–present

Kickboxing record
- Total: 39
- Wins: 30
- By knockout: 11
- Losses: 8
- By knockout: 6
- Draws: 1
- Last updated on: December 13, 2013

Rustemi Kreshnik (Albanian: Kreshnik Rrustemi; born April 29, 1984) is a Belgian kickboxer who competed in the heavyweight division. Having moved to Belgium from Kosovo (then part of Yugoslavia) as a youngster, Kreshnik began training in Muay Thai and kickboxing while working as a bouncer. He turned professional in 2003 and rose to prominence by claiming the Belgian and Benelux titles before going on to become a gatekeeper in the It's Showtime promotion from 2009 until the organization's demise in 2012.

== Career ==
=== Early career (2003–2008) ===
Kreshnik was born in the city of Pejë, Yugoslavia, in what is today Kosovo. He spent the first years of his life there with his first main interest being skiing, not fighting. In 1998, he left Peć to live with his sister in the city of Antwerp in Belgium. Growing up in Belgium, after initially struggling with the language, he started training as a mechanic with his future seemingly in the auto trade industry. To supplant his income, he also worked nights at a local club that was no stranger to trouble. At one of these nights, he met his future trainers Peter Lamberts and Omar Bel Hadi who invited him to their Muay Thai club where he started training in the art.

After fighting on a number of shows in Belgium and fast establishing himself as one of the top heavyweights in the country. he made his K-1 debut (and so far only appearance for the organization) on February 24, 2006, at a small event in Tournai, France, where he faced Souleimane Konate for the World Full Contact Association (WFCA) Benelux Heavyweight (-95 kg/209 lb) Thaiboxing Championship, winning by stoppage. He held his title for little over a month, however, losing to Dutch-based Palestinian Mo Boubkhari in his next fight in Brussels. At the end of the year, Kreshnik overcame his biggest challenge yet when he defeated former K-1 fighter Naoufal Benazzouz at the Time for Action event across the border in the Netherlands.

=== It's Showtime (2009–2012) ===
It was the victory over Benazzouz that drew Rustemi to the fledgling It's Showtime organization who made him their fifth Belgian-based signing in September 2008 (although he had first fought and won on an It's Showtime card back in 2005). By signing to such a competitive organization, Rustemi would have the chance to face some of Europe's top fighters. He made his official promotional debut on February 8, 2009, at Fights at the Border presents: It's Showtime 2009 in his home town of Antwerp, facing two time world champion Mourad Bouzidi, and losing via stoppage due to a cut in the first round.

He returned three months later to take on Christiano Delgado on the It's Showtime 2009 Amsterdam supercard at the Amsterdam Arena, where he won by technical knockout due to referee stoppage in the third round, but then dropped a decision to Wendell Roche at It's Showtime 2009 Budapest on August 29, 2009.

On October 29, 2009, he scored the biggest victory of his career by defeating Rico Verhoeven at It's Showtime 2009 Lommel. The bout was scored a draw after the regulation three rounds, but Kreshnik was given the nod by the judges after a close extension round. He then followed this up with another points win over Tomáš Hron at It's Showtime 2010 Amsterdam on May 29, 2010, before stepping up to face the reigning It's Showtime Heavyweight Champion Hesdy Gerges in a non-title affair at Fightingstars presents: It's Showtime 2010 in Amsterdam, Netherlands on September 12, 2010. Gerges was simply too good, however, and stopped Kreshnik with low kicks in the second round.

Following this defeat, Kreshnik decided to move down to the 95 kg/209 lb weight class and debuted in this division against former amateur standout Nenad Pagonis at Yiannis Evgenikos presents: It's Showtime Athens on December 11, 2010, losing a unanimous decision. He then returned to the heavyweight division to take on Moises Baute at BFN Group & Music Hall presents: It's Showtime "Fast & Furious 70MAX" in Brussels on September 25, 2011, and won by knockout in round two.

He was then expected to fight at the K-1 World Grand Prix 2011 in Nanjing Final 16 on October 29, 2011. However, the event was cancelled due to the promotion experiencing severe financial problems.

Kreshnik returned to the ring after eight months of inactivity with a first-round TKO of Michael Duut at Siam Gym Belgium presents: It's Showtime 56 in Kortrijk, Belgium.

He was initially scheduled to face the legendary Jérôme Le Banner at the June 30, 2012 Music Hall & BFN Group present: It's Showtime 57 & 58, but the Frenchman was forced to pull out due to contract issues and Kreshnik was instead given a rematch with Mourad Bouzidi. He lost by stoppage once again, this time suffering a horrific broken nose from a Bouzidi knee knockout in round two.

=== Recent career (2013–present) ===
After eighteen months of inactivity following It's Showtime's buyout and subsequent closure by Glory, Kreshnik made his return to the ring at FFC10: Rodriguez vs. Batzelas in Skopje, Macedonia on December 13, 2013, taking a unanimous decision over Dino Belošević.

He was scheduled to fight at the SUPERKOMBAT World Grand Prix I 2015 in Ploiești, Romania on 7 March 2015 but pulled out for unknown reasons.

He was scheduled to fight at the SUPERKOMBAT World Grand Prix 2015 Final Elimination in Milan, Italy on 2 October 2015 but pulled out due to injury leaving Raul Cătinaș without opponent and out of the event.

Kreshnik appeared in the videoclip Street Credibility by the Belgian rapper CHG Unfadable.

== Championships and awards ==
=== Kickboxing ===
- World Full Contact Association
  - WFCA European Super Heavyweight (+95 kg/+209 lb) K1 Championship
  - WFCA Belgian Heavyweight (-95 kg/209 lb) Thaiboxing Championship
  - WFCA Benelux Heavyweight (-95 kg/209 lb) Thaiboxing Championship

== Kickboxing record ==
Kickboxing record
30 wins (11 KOs), 8 losses, 1 draw
Date	Result	Opponent	Event	Location	Method	Round	Time	Record
2015-05-16	Loss	(Suriname) Ismael Londt	A1 World Combat Cup	Eindhoven, Netherlands	TKO (referee stoppage)	1		30–8–1
2014-12-06	Win	(Germany) Andre Schmeling	Fights at the Border	Lommel, Belgium	Decision	5	3:00	30–7–1
For the WFCA European Heavyweight Title +95 kg.
2014-09-13	Win	(Russia) Alexander Volobuev	Tatneft Arena World Cup 2012 final, Super Fight	Kazan, Russia	TKO (3 knockdowns)	1		29–7–1
2013-12-13	Win	(Croatia) Dino Belošević	FFC10: Rodriguez vs. Batzelas	Skopje, Macedonia	Decision (unanimous)	3	3:00	28–7–1
2012-06-30	Loss	(Tunisia) Mourad Bouzidi	Music Hall & BFN Group present: It's Showtime 57 & 58	Brussels, Belgium	KO (right knee)	2	0:25	27–7–1
2012-05-12	Win	(Netherlands) Michael Duut	Siam Gym Belgium presents: It's Showtime 56	Kortrijk, Belgium	TKO (punches)	1	3:00	27–6–1
2011-09-25	Win	(Spain) Moises Baute	BFN Group & Music Hall presents: It's Showtime "Fast & Furious 70MAX"	Brussels, Belgium	KO (right hook)	2	1:41	26–6–1
2010-12-11	Loss	(Serbia) Nenad Pagonis	Yiannis Evgenikos presents: It's Showtime Athens	Athens, Greece	Decision (unanimous)	3	3:00	25–6–1
2010-09-12	Loss	(Netherlands) Hesdy Gerges	Fightingstars presents: It's Showtime 2010	Amsterdam, Netherlands	TKO (low kicks)	2	2:33	25–5–1
2010-05-29	Win	(Czech Republic) Tomáš Hron	It's Showtime 2010 Amsterdam	Amsterdam, Netherlands	Decision	3	3:00	25–4–1
2010-04-10	Win	(Netherlands) Errol Parris	Star Muaythai V	Maastricht, Netherlands	TKO (referee stoppage)	1		24–4–1
2009-10-24	Win	(Netherlands) Rico Verhoeven	It's Showtime 2009 Lommel	Lommel, Belgium	Extension round decision	4	3:00	23–4–1
2009-08-29	Loss	(Curaçao) Wendell Roche	It's Showtime 2009 Budapest	Budapest, Hungary	Decision	3	3:00	22–4–1
2009-05-16	Win	(Netherlands) Christiano Delgado	It's Showtime 2009 Amsterdam	Amsterdam, Netherlands	TKO (referee stoppage)	3		22–3–1
2009-02-08	Loss	(Tunisia) Mourad Bouzidi	Fights at the Border presents: It's Showtime 2009	Antwerp, Belgium	TKO (cut)	1	1:53	21–3–1
2008-05-24	Win	(Turkey) Volkan Düzgün	Gentleman Promotions Fight Night V	Tilburg, Netherlands	Decision	3	3:00	
2007-12-02	Win	(Morocco) Naoufal Benazzouz	Time for Action	Nijmegen, Netherlands	Decision	3	3:00	
2007-03-18	Loss	(Palestine) Mo Boubkhari	"The Real Team" Thai-box Gala	Brussels, Belgium	TKO (cut)			
Loses the WFCA Benelux Heavyweight (-95 kg/209 lb) Thaiboxing Championship.
2007-02-24	Win	(France) Souleimane Konaté	K-1 Rules Heavy Weights Academy 2007	Tournai, Belgium	TKO (doctor stoppage)			
Wins the WFCA Benelux Heavyweight (-95 kg/209 lb) Thaiboxing Championship.
2007-01-13	Win	(Belgium) Zourdani Osman Gym	BKBMO Muay Thai Gala	Zwevegem, Belgium	Decision (unanimous)	3	2:00	
2006-12-03	Win	(Belgium) Daveaux Shianshinkai	Muay Thai Gala Brussels	Brussels, Belgium	KO	4		
2005-10-00	Loss	(Belgium) Filip Verlinden	Fight of the Gladiator 4	Belgium	Decision	5	2:00	
2005-10-02	Win	(Netherlands) Robert Willems	It's Showtime 75MAX Trophy, 1st Round - Tilburg	Tilburg, Netherlands	TKO (doctor stoppage)	1		
2005-00-00	Win	(Austria) David Keclik		Austria	KO (spinning back kick)	1		
2003-11-15	Win	(Belgium) Funzi	WKA Brussels Fight Night	Brussels, Belgium	TKO	2		
2003-10-18	Win	(Belgium) Bruno Geerinckx	Muay Thai Gala Deurne	Deurne, Belgium	Decision (unanimous)	3	2:00	
Legend: Win Loss Draw/No contest Notes
