= Priatelia Zeme – SPZ =

- Formation: 1996; 30 years ago
- Type: NGO
- Purpose: environment, waste reduction
- Headquarters: Košice
- Region served: Slovakia
- Chairman: Martin Valentovič
- Vice-chairman: Branislav Moňok
- Project manager: Lenka Beznáková
- Parent organization: Friends of the Earth International
- Website: www.priateliazeme.sk/spz/

Priatelia Zeme – SPZ (Slovak, translated to English as Friends of the Earth - SPZ) is a non-profit organisation protecting environment and nature in Slovakia and Europe since 1996. Priatelia Zeme – SPZ leads campaigns in the area of waste management and works on relating to waste, such as natural resources consumption, toxic substances use and disposal, effects of incinerators and packaging issues. They are independent from any government or political parties.

== Scope of work ==
- information and education (information campaigns, workshops, trainings, lectures...)
- campaigns to stop harmful activities
- help to municipalities and towns in reducing the amount of waste and development of separate waste collection
- projects to implement sustainable solutions (e.g. separation, composting, recycling, waste reduction)
- research, monitoring
- legislative changes

Priatelia Zeme – SPZ is a member of Friends of the Earth International (FoEI).
