= José Reis (kickboxer) =

Portuguese-Cape Verdean kickboxer (born 1977)

- Born: March 9, 1977 (age 49); Cape Verde
- Other names: The Devil's Advocate
- Nationality: Portuguese
- Height: 1.82 m (5 ft 11 1/2 in)
- Weight: 75 kg (165 lb; 11.8 st)
- Division: Welterweight; Super Middleweight
- Style: Muay Thai, Kickboxing
- Fighting out of: Lisbon, Portugal
- Team: Olival Gym

Kickboxing record
- Total: 60
- Wins: 38
- By knockout: 14
- Losses: 20
- Draws: 2

Other information
- Notable relatives: Luis Reis - brother
- Last updated on: February 19, 2011

José 'The Devil's Advocate' Reis (born 30 June 1977) is a Portuguese Muay Thai kickboxer of Cape Verdean descent fighting out of Lisbon, Portugal for Olival Gym at either welterweight or super middleweight. He is the 2010 W.F.C.A. Full Contact world champion and a x2 K-1 MAX regional champion who has fought for both the K-1 MAX and SuperLeague organizations. His younger brother, Luis Reis, is also a successful kickboxer.

== Biography and career ==
In his early years José had a successful spell as an amateur winning three Iberian championships and a gold medal in the I.M.T.F. European championships as well as a number of bronze medals in various W.A.K.O. and I.M.T.F. European/world championships. In 2002 he won his first professional title at the K-1 Spain MAX 2002, where he defeated Ante Bilić in the final of the eight man tournament.

In 2004 he won his second K-1 MAX tournament, this time in held in Portugal, defeating his own brother Luis in the semi-finals. Despite winning another regional tournament José would not be given the chance to qualify for the K-1 MAX final. In 2005 he signed up with the recently created SuperLeague organization and he had ten fights within the organization between 2005 and 2006, winning four and losing six. His highlight was a runner up position at the SuperLeague Elimination 2006 tournament losing to Jordan Tai in the final.

After the SuperLeague organizations demise at the end of 2006 José won the W.F.C.A. European title and had a spell with the Steko's Fight Night and KlasH promotions, losing out to Yohan Lidon in a fight for the W.K.A. world title. He also returned to amateur action in 2007, picking up a bronze medal and then a silver the following year at the W.A.K.O. European championships. In 2010 he had his most recent success, defeating Gago Drago via controversial decision to claim the W.F.C.A. world title.

== Titles ==
Professional

- 2010 World Full Contact Association (W.F.C.A.) K-1 Rules World champion -72.5 kg
- 2007 Kings of Kickboxing Karlsruhe runner up -75 kg
- 2007 W.F.C.A. Thai-boxing European champion -75 kg
- 2006 Super League Elimination tournament runner up -73 kg
- 2004 K-1 MAX Portugal tournament champion -70 kg
- 2002 K-1 Spain MAX tournament champion -70 kg

Amateur

- 2008 W.A.K.O. European Championships in Porto, Portugal (silver) -75 kg (K-1 Rules)
- 2007 W.A.K.O. World Championships in Serbia, Belgrade (bronze) -75 kg (K-1 Rules)
- 2002 I.A.M.T.F. Muay Thai European Championships in Caldas da Rainha, Portugal (gold) -71 kg
- 2002 Iberian Championships (gold)
- 2001 I.A.M.T.F Muay Thai World Championships in Bangkok, Thailand (bronze) -69 kg
- 2001 W.A.K.O. World Championships in Belgrade, Serbia & Montenegro (bronze) -71 kg (Low Kick)
- 2001 Iberian Championships (gold)
- 2000 W.A.K.O. European Championships in Moscow, Russia (bronze)
- 2000 Iberian Championships (gold)

== Professional Kickboxing Record ==
Professional Kickboxing Record
38 Wins (14 (T)KOs), 20 Losses, 2 Draws
Date	Result	Opponent	Event	Location	Method	Round	Time
2010-03-06	Win	(Armenia) Gago Drago	Gala Internacional de Kickboxing	Alenquer, Portugal	Decision	5	3:00
Wins W.F.C.A. K-1 Rules world title -72.5 kg.
2009-10-18	Draw	(Portugal) Arnaldo Silva	W.A.K.O. Champions League	Lisbon, Portugal	Ext.R Decision Draw	4	3:00
2009-01-24	Loss	(Morocco) Khalid Bourdif	Beast of the East 2009, Quarter-finals	Zutphen, Netherlands	Decision	3	3:00
2008-11-08	Loss	(Albania) Arian Vatnikaj	KlasH European Elimination 2008, Semi-finals	Hanau, Germany	Decision	3	3:00
2008-11-08	Win	(England) Rick Barnhill	KlasH European Elimination 2008, Quarter-finals	Hanau, Germany	TKO (Ref Stop/Right Hook)	2	
2008-07-06	Loss	(Netherlands) Perry Ubeda	Ultimate Glory 8	Nijmegen, Netherlands	Decision	5	2:00
2008-05-31	Loss	(Netherlands) Nieky Holzken	Beast of the East 2008	Zutphen, Netherlands	Decision (Unanimous)	5	3:00
2008-03-08	Loss	(France) Yohan Lidon	Steko's Fight Night 28, W.K.A. Final	Munich, Germany	Decision (Unanimous)	3	3:00
Fight was for W.K.A. K-1 Rules world title -70 kg.
2008-03-08	Win	(England) Ashley Guishard	Steko's Fight Night 28, W.K.A. Semi-finals	Munich, Germany	Decision	3	3:00
2007-12-08	Loss	(France) Yohan Lidon	Steko's Fight Night 27, W.K.A. Semi-finals	Munich, Germany	Decision	3	3:00
2007-12-08	Win	(Belgium) Jan de Keyzer	Steko's Fight Night 27, W.K.A. Quarter-finals	Munich, Germany	Decision	3	3:00
2007-11-24	Loss	(Italy) Giorgio Petrosyan	Janus Fight Night 2007, Quarter-finals	Padua, Italy	Decision (Unanimous)	3	3:00
2007-08-31	Loss	(France) Cedric Muller	Steko's Fight Night 25, Final	Karlsruhe, Germany	Decision	3	3:00
Fight was for Kings of Kickboxing 2007 Karlsruhe tournament -75 kg. Despite defeat is invited to Steko's Fight Night 27 to take part in the W.K.A. world championship -75 kg.
2007-08-31	Win	(Suriname) Rayen Simson	Steko's Fight Night 25, Semi-finals	Karlsruhe, Germany	Decision	3	3:00
2007-04-28	Win	(France) Wallid Haddad	KlasH Champions Battlefield	Höör, Sweden	TKO (Shin Injury)	1	
2007-01-27	Win	(Lithuania) Darius Skliaudys	WFCA Baltia Grand Prix	Riga, Latvia	KO	1	
Wins W.F.C.A. Thai-boxing European title -75 kg.
2006-12-02	Loss	(Suriname) Marco Piqué	Janus Fight Night 2007, Quarter-finals	Padua, Italy	Decision	3	3:00
2006-10-17	Loss	(France) Farid Villaume	A-1 Combat Cup 2006, Quarter-finals	Istanbul, Turkey	Decision	5	3:00
2006-10-15	Win	(Australia) Jenk Behic	A-1 Combat Cup 2006, 1st round	Istanbul, Turkey	KO	4	
2006-05-13	Loss	(New Zealand) Jordan Tai	SuperLeague Elimination 2006, Final	Vienna, Austria	Decision (Unanimous)	3	3:00
Fight was for SuperLeague Elimination 2006 tournament -73 kg.
2006-05-13	Win	(Egypt) Amir Zeyada	SuperLeague Elimination 2006, Semi-finals	Vienna, Austria	Decision	3	3:00
2006-05-13	Win	(Turkey) Şahin Yakut	SuperLeague Elimination 2006, Quarter-finals	Vienna, Austria	Decision	3	3:00
2006-03-11	Loss	(Cape Verde) Alviar Lima	SuperLeague Apocalypse 2006	Paris, France	Decision (Unanimous)	3	3:00
2006-01-28	Loss	(Assyrian homeland) Fadi Merza	SuperLeague Hungary 2006	Budapest, Hungary	Decision	3	3:00
2005-11-19	Win	(France) Cedric Muller	SuperLeague Portugal 2005	Carcavelos, Portugal	Decision	3	3:00
2005-09-24	Loss	(Cape Verde) Alviar Lima	Super League Turkey 2005, Quarter-finals	Istanbul, Turkey	Decision	3	3:00
2005-05-21	Loss	(New Zealand) Jordan Tai	SuperLeague Germany 2005	Oberhausen, Germany	KO (Right High Kick)	2	
2005-04-09	Win	(Philippines) Ole Laursen	SuperLeague Austria 2005	Vienna, Austria	Decision	5	3:00
2004-12-18	Draw	(Spain) Rafi Zouheir	K-1 MAX Spain 2004, Super Fight	Guadalajara, Spain	Decision Draw	3	3:00
2004-10-23	Loss	(Germany) Rene Müller	SuperLeague Germany 2004	Oberhausen, Germany	TKO (Doc Stop/Cut)	5	
2004-04-02	Win	(France) Tarik Farina	K-1 MAX Portugal 2004, Final	Lisbon, Portugal	TKO	1	
Wins K-1 MAX Portugal 2004 tournament -70 kg.
2004-04-02	Win	(Portugal) Luis Reis	K-1 MAX Portugal 2004, Semi-finals	Lisbon, Portugal	TKO	2	
2004-04-02	Win	(Spain) Carlos Heredia	K-1 MAX Portugal 2004, Quarter-finals	Lisbon, Portugal	Decision (Split)	3	3:00
2003-10-31	Loss	(Croatia) Ante Bilić	K-1 Final Fight Stars War in Zagreb	Zagreb, Croatia	Decision (Split)	5	3:00
2003-08-20	Loss	(Spain) Carlos Heredia	K-1 Spain GP 2003, Super Fight	Barcelona, Spain	Disqualified		
2002-12-14	Win	(Croatia) Ante Bilić	K-1 Spain MAX 2002, Final	Barcelona, Spain	Decision	3	3:00
Wins K-1 Spain MAX 2002 tournament -70 kg.
2002-12-14	Win	(Czech Republic) Ondřej Hutník	K-1 Spain MAX 2002, Semi-finals	Barcelona, Spain	TKO (Ref Stop/Cut)	1	
2002-12-14	Win	(Netherlands) Roger Van de Heiden	K-1 Spain MAX 2002, Quarter-finals	Barcelona, Spain	Decision	3	3:00
Legend: Win Loss Draw/No contest Notes

== Amateur Kickboxing Record ==
Amateur Kickboxing Record
Date	Result	Opponent	Event	Location	Method	Round	Time
2008-11-30	Loss	(Belarus) Yury Harbachou	W.A.K.O. European Championships '08, K-1 Rules Final -75 kg	Porto, Portugal	Decision (Split)	3	3:00
Wins W.A.K.O. European Championship '08 K-1 Rules Silver Medal -75 kg.
2008-11-?	Win	(Turkey) Mehmet Aygun	W.A.K.O. European Championships '08, K-1 Rules Semi-finals -75 kg	Porto, Portugal	Decision (Unanimous)	3	3:00
2008-11-?	Win	(Poland) Artur Szychowski	W.A.K.O. European Championships '08, K-1 Rules Quarter-finals -75 kg	Porto, Portugal	Decision (Unanimous)	3	3:00
2007-09-?	Loss	(Belarus) Yury Harbachou	W.A.K.O. World Championships '07, K-1 Rules Semi-finals -75 kg	Belgrade, Serbia			
Wins W.A.K.O. European Championship '07 K-1 Rules Bronze Medal -75 kg.
2007-09-?	Win	(Slovakia) Vladimir Konsky	W.A.K.O. World Championships '07, K-1 Rules Quarter-finals -75 kg	Belgrade, Serbia			
2007-09-?	Win	(Bulgaria) Krasimir Aprostolov	W.A.K.O. World Championships '07, K-1 Rules 2nd round -75 kg	Belgrade, Serbia			
Had bye through to 2nd round.
2006-11-23	Loss	(Russia) Denis Dikusar	W.A.K.O. European Championships '06 -71 kg, Thai-Boxing 1st round -71 kg	Skopje, Macedonia	Decision (Unanimous)	3	3:00
2006-10-?	Loss	(Bulgaria) Krasimir Aprostolov	W.A.K.O. European Championships '06, Full Contact 2nd round -75 kg	Lisbon, Portugal	Decision (Split)	3	3:00
2006-10-?	Win	(Slovakia) Pavol Garaj	W.A.K.O. European Championships '06, Full Contact 1st round -75 kg	Lisbon, Portugal	Decision (Unanimous)	3	3:00
2002-10-28	Win	(Russia)	I.A.M.T.F. Amateur European Championships '02, Muay Thai Final -75 kg	Caldas da Rainha, Portugal			
Wins I.A.M.T.F. Amateur European Championship '02 Muay Thai Gold Medal -71 kg.
Legend: Win Loss Draw/No contest Notes

== See also ==
- List of K-1 events
- List of K-1 champions
- List of male kickboxers
