= King in the Ring =

New Zealand professional kick-boxing tournament

- Sport: Kickboxing
- Founded: 2011
- Owners: Jason Suttie and Arna Johnson-Suttie
- Country: New Zealand
- Venues: ASB Stadium; Te Rauparaha Arena; YMCA Stadium Auckland City; Eventfinda Stadium
- Most recent champion: Suran Juanmiry (1st title)
- Most titles: Israel Adesanya (3 Titles)
- Broadcaster: TVNZ
- Promotion to: King in the Ring Fight Series
- Website: King in the Ring

King in the Ring is an 8-man elimination kickboxing tournament that is held in Aotearoa, New Zealand.

== Tournament format ==
King in the Ring is a single-elimination eight man tournament that is complete in one night. The tournament format consists of seven K1 rules kickboxing bouts with each bout being scheduled for three, three minute rounds with a minute break. If after three rounds a fight is declared a draw, an extra round is required to determine the winner and the decision is based on the extra round only. A random draw out of a hat is conducted before the event to determine which fighters contest each other in the four quarter final matches. There is a maximum knockdown rule, where a fighter cannot be knocked down more than 3 times in the night.

== History ==
=== King in the Ring 100 kg I ===
The Tournament was competed on 20 May 2011 at ASB Stadium, Auckland, New Zealand. The undercard featured two WKBF World title bouts, including Roger Earp vs Joe Concha & Bronwyn Wylie vs Tegan Papasergi. The undercard also featured Muay Thai NZ title bout with James Gordon vs Rod McSwain. The opening bout of the night was ONeil Wiperi vs Ricky Hita.

Quarterfinals
Henry Taani (S.A.L.T)	Win
Sasha Kunts (City Lee Gar)
Antz Nansen (ETK)	Win
Junior Ioane (Highlanders Gym)
Josh Heta (ETK Northshore)	Win
Papa Gabriel
Nato Laauli (Alpha Muay Thai)	Win
Tafa Misipati (ETK)

Semifinals
Henry Taani (S.A.L.T)
Antz Nansen (ETK)	Win
Josh Heta (ETK Northshore)	Win
Nato Laauli (Alpha Muay Thai)

Final
Antz Nansen (ETK)	Win
Josh Heta (ETK Northshore)

=== King in the Ring 72 kg I ===
The Tournament was competed on 28 October 2011 at ASB Stadium, Auckland, New Zealand. The undercard featured a WKBF World Title Bout with Antz Nansen vs Eric Nosa. The undercard also featured Joey Baylon vs Chris Wells and Travis Green vs Ricky Hita.

Quarterfinals
Brad Riddell (City Lee Gar)	Win
Brendan Varty (Harleys Gym, Masterton)
Edwin Samy (ETK)	Win
Sonny Sadler (Hardmans Gym)
Joe Hopkins (City Lee Gar)	Win
Dimitri Simoukov (ETK)
Girish Rae	Win
Taylor Holland

Semifinals
Brad Riddell (City Lee Gar)
Edwin Samy (ETK)	Win
Joe Hopkins (City Lee Gar)	Win
Girish Rae

Final
Edwin Samy (ETK)
Joe Hopkins (City Lee Gar)	Win

=== King in the Ring 62 kg I ===
The Tournament was competed on 19 May 2012 at ASB Stadium, Auckland, New Zealand. The undercard featured Jake Crane vs Colin Chu, Michelle Preston vs Nikki Bigwood and Aaron Goddard vs Daniel Harris.

Quarterfinals
Roger Earp (ETK)	Win
Chris Wells (SMAC)
Ra Redden (Alpha Muay Thai)	Win
Ricki Campbell (Strikeforce)
Ben Sisam (Strikeforce)	Win
Taylor Holland (Pathai)
Sone Vannathy (Arch Angel Thai Boxing)	Win
Joey Baylon (ETK)

Semifinals
Roger Earp (ETK)	Win
Ra Redden (Alpha Muay Thai)
Sone Vannathy (Arch Angel Thai Boxing)	Win
Ben Sisam (Strikeforce)

Final
Roger Earp (ETK)
Sone Vannathy (Arch Angel Thai Boxing)	Win

=== King in the Ring 100+ kg I ===
The Tournament was competed on 1 September 2012 at ASB Stadium, Auckland, New Zealand. The undercard featured William Robson De Oliveira vs Josh Marsters, Pane Haraki vs "Lightning" Mike Angove and Amateur Kickboxing WKBF NZ Title Fight James Eades vs Pati Afoa.

Quarterfinals
Pauli Lakai	KO
Thomas Peato	2nd Rnd
Nato Laauli	SD
Josh Wikiriwhi-Heta
Mika Maliefulu	UD
Hiriwa Te Rangi
Tafa Misipati	PTS
Henry Taani

Semifinals
Pauli Lakai	KO
Nato Laauli	2nd Rnd
Mike Maliefulu	KO
Tafa Misipati	1st Rnd

Final
Pauli Lakai	KO
Tafa Misipati	1st Rnd

=== King in the Ring 86 kg I ===
The Tournament was competed on 13 April 2013 at ASB Stadium, Auckland, New Zealand. The undercard featured Yousef Almesfer vs Andrew Watson, Mikaera Povey vs Zak Fatamaka, WMC Lightweight Title Ra Redden vs Joey Baylon, Brendan Varty vs Edwin Samy, Richie Hardcore vs Hayden Todd and Andrew Peck and Tafa Misipati.

Quarterfinals
Jamie Eades (ETK Northshore)	Win
Slava Alexeichik (City Lee Gar)
Kyle Gallacher (Knee Assassins Guild)	Win
Pati Afoa (ETK)
TY Williams (Alpha Muay Thai)	Win
Joey Trevan (ETK)
Francis Vesetolu (SMAC)	Win
Jan 'Karel Sroubek' Antolik (City Lee Gar)

Semifinals
Jamie Eades (ETK Northshore)
Kyle Gallacher (Knee Assassins Guild)	Win
TY Williams (Alpha Muay Thai)	Win
Francis Vesetolu (SMAC)

Final
Kyle Gallacher (Knee Assassins Guild)
TY Williams (Alpha Muay Thai)	Win

=== King in the Ring 100 kg II ===
The Tournament was competed on 9 November 2013 at ASB Stadium, Auckland, New Zealand. The undercard featured Sanchai Aung vs Joey "The Filipino Kid" Baylon, Gaella "The Slayer" Nixon Baybee “Pitbull” Nansen, Benson Eves vs Wayne Hehea, Nikolas "The Greek" Charalampous vs Scott Taliauli, Edwin "Electric" Samy vs Mikaera "Shotgun" Povey, Tony Angelov vs Andrew Bannam and Pati "The Arsenal" Afoa vs Kyle "The Knee Assassin" Gallacher.

Quarterfinals
Pane "The Punisher" Haraki (Haraki Gym)	SD
Tussi Asafo (Grizzly Thaiboxing)
Antz "Notorious" Nansen (ETK)	UD
Dan "The Man" Stirling (He Toa Muay Thai)
Tafa "Thumper" Misipati (ETK)	UD
Faisal "Diamond Flyer" Zakaria (Diamond Flyer Muay Thai)
Nato Laauli (Alpha Muay Thai)	UD
Josh "Jaguar" Heta (ETK North Shore)

Semifinals
Pane "The Punisher" Haraki (Haraki Gym)
Antz "Notorious" Nansen (ETK)	UD
Tafa "Thumper" Misipati (ETK)
Nato Laauli (Alpha Muay Thai)	UD

Final
Antz "Notorious" Nansen (ETK)	UD
Nato Laauli (Alpha Muay Thai)

=== King in the Ring 62 kg II & 4 Women 55 kg ===
These Tournaments were competed on 12 April 2014 at ASB Stadium, Auckland, New Zealand. The undercard featured Mike Beavington vs David 'Sanchai' Aung, WKBF World Cruiserweight Title TY Williams vs Ben "Iron Fist" Johnson and Antz “Notorious” Nansen vs Nato Laauli.

Quarterfinals
Ra "Razor" Reddon	UD
Joey "The Filipino Kid" Baylon
Jordan "Sniper" Syme	UD
Ben "Brawla" Sisam
Sone "Arch Angel" Vannathy	KO
Chris "Butcher Boy" Wells	1st Rnd
Sefa "The Silent One" Fue	UD
Alexi "Phet" Serepisos

Semifinals
Ra "Razor" Reddon	TKO
Jordan "Sniper" Syme	2nd Rnd
Sone "Arch Angel" Vannathy	UD
Sefa "The Silent One" Fue

Final
Ra "Razor" Reddon	UD
Sone "Arch Angel" Vannathy

Semifinals
1	Gentiane Lupi	UD
4	Amy Vaughn
3	Rochelle Stroh	UD
2	Roshelle McGee

Finals
Gentiane Lupi	KO
Rochelle Stroh	2nd Rnd

=== King in the Ring 100+ kg II ===
These Tournaments were competed on 20 June 2014 at ASB Stadium, Auckland, New Zealand. The undercard featured Sam 'The Shank' Hill vs Sailmon Boonruam, WKBF & WMC Cruiserweight Title Pati Afoa vs Zane Hopman, Victor Mechkov vs Joe Hopkins and Sone Vannathy vs Cheyne Rees.

Quarterfinals
Benson Eves (City Kickboxing)	UD
Robin Suttie (Elite That Kickboxing)
Felise Leniu (Fobfather MMA)	TKO
Leamy Tato (Tranzformus Gym)	2nd Rnd
Tafa Misipati (Elite Thai Kickboxing)	UD
Avau Faafuata (Grizzly Thai Boxing)
Rik Barclay (Strikeforce Canterbury)	MD
Nato Laauli (Alpha Muay Thai)	4 Rnds

Semifinals
Benson Eves (City Kickboxing)	SD
Felise Leniu (Fobfather MMA)	4 Rnds
Tafa Misipati (Elite Thai Kickboxing)	KO
Rik Barclay (Strikeforce Canterbury)	3rd Rnd

Final
Benson Eves (City Kickboxing)	KO
Tafa Misipati (Elite Thai Kickboxing)	1st Rnd

=== King in the Ring 86 kg II ===
These Tournaments were competed on 30 August 2014 at ASB Stadium, Auckland, New Zealand. The undercard featured Bronwyn 'Braveheart' Wylie vs Gaela 'The Slayer' Nixon, Edwin 'Electric' Samy vs Johnny 'Ruthless' Rickard, Ra 'Razor' Redden vs Jordan 'Sniper' Syme, Antz 'Notorious' Nansen vs Alofa Solitua and Hammad 'The General' Alloush vs Tafa 'Thumper' Misipati.

Quarterfinals
Israel 'The Stylebender' Adesanaya (City Kickboxing)	UD
Slava 'Scarface' Alexeichik
Pati 'The Arsenal' Afoa (ETK)	SD
Zac 'Fearless' Fatamaka (Grizzly Thai Boxing)
Jamie 'The Kyokushin Kid' Eades (ETK North)	MD
Zane 'Hybrid' Hopman (Fortitude Thai Boxing)
T.Y. Williams (Alpha Thai Boxing)	KO
Andrew 'Bulldog' Banham	1st Rnd

Semifinals
Israel 'The Stylebender' Adesanaya (City Kickboxing)	KO
Pati 'The Arsenal' Afoa (ETK)	2nd Rnd
Jamie 'The Kyokushin Kid' Eades (ETK North)	UD
T.Y. Williams (Alpha Thai Boxing)

Final
Israel 'The Stylebender' Adesanaya (City Kickboxing)	TKO
Jamie 'The Kyokushin Kid' Eades (ETK North)	3rd Rnd

=== King in the Ring 72 kg III ===
These Tournaments were competed on 8 November 2014 at ASB Stadium, Auckland, New Zealand. The undercard featured Joey 'The Filipino Kid' Baylon vs Terry 'Turbo' Kounsavat, Mike 'Farmer' Fotheringhame vs Josh 'Method Man' Marsters, Sam 'the Shank' Hill vs Nathan 'Nasty Boy' Robson, Pati 'Arsenal' Afoa vs Simon 'Mayhem' Maait and Dan 'The Pain' Roberts vs Paulo 'The Barbarian' Lakai.

Quarterfinals
Harley 'Lethal' Love (City Lee Gar)	SD
Jake 'The Snake' Crane (Helensville Thai Boxing)
Blood Diamond (City Kickboxing)	TKO
Carlos 'The Flying Fijian' Hicks (House of Pain)	1st RD
Edwin 'Electric' Samy (ETK)	MD
Brook 'on the Button' Sutton (Diamond Muay Thai)
Brook 'VC' Haami (MTI Wellington)	UD
Chris 'Cobra' Eades (Elite Thai Kickboxing Northshore)

Semifinals
Harley 'Lethal' Love (City Lee Gar)	KO
Blood Diamond (City Kickboxing)	1st Rnd
Edwin 'Electric' Samy (ETK)	SD
Brook 'VC' Haami (MTI Wellington)	4 rnds

Final
Blood Diamond (City Kickboxing)	UD
Edwin 'Electric' Samy (ETK)

=== King in the Ring 86 kg III ===
These Tournaments were competed on 11 April 2015 at ASB Stadium, Auckland, New Zealand. The undercard featured Chris 'Cobra' Eades vs Jordan 'Sniper' Syme, Nato 'Hard Knocks' Laauli vs Pane 'The Punisher' Haraki, Sone 'Arch Angel' Vannathy vs Pumipi 'Ceazer' Ngaronoa and Blood Diamond vs 'Dirty' Sanchez.

Quarterfinals
Zane 'Hybrid' Hopman (Fortitude Thai Boxing)	UD
Kurt Pegoraro (Corporate Boxing Gym)
Simon 'Mayhem' Maait (Bulldog Gym)	UD
Zak 'Fearless' Fatamaka (Grizzly Thai Boxing)
Israel 'The Style Bender' Adesanya (City Kickboxing)	UD
Kim Loudon (Extreme Gym)
Mark Timms (Bulldog Gym, Manly)	PTS
Pati 'The Arsenal' Afoa (ETK)†	4th Rnd

Semifinals
Zane 'Hybrid' Hopman (Fortitude Thai Boxing)
Simon 'Mayhem' Maait (Bulldog Gym)†	UD
Israel 'The Style Bender' Adesanya (City Kickboxing)'	TKO
Mark Timms (Bulldog Gym, Manly)	2nd RND

Final
Pati 'The Arsenal' Afoa (ETK)†	KO
Israel 'The Style Bender' Adesanya (City Kickboxing)'	1st Rnd

† Both semi-finalists from Maait vs Hopman were injured in their bout. Due to this, both were not able to continue into the final. Pati Afoa was the only kickboxer willing to go into the finals, despite losing in the first round of the tournament.

=== King in the Ring 62 kg III ===
These Tournaments were competed on 19 June 2015 at Te Rauparaha Arena, Porirua, New Zealand. The undercard featured Kieran Garcia vs Gerard Roach, Zane 'Hybrid' Hopman vs Pati 'The Arsenal' Afoa, Gentiane 'AAA' Lupi vs Natalia 'The Hun' Teller, Nick Taylor vs Sean 'Ruthless' Redgrave and Nato 'Hard Knocks' Laauli vs Thomas 'The Island Tank' Peato.

Quarterfinals
Alexi 'Phet' Serepisos (Jai Thai Boxing)	SD
Sone 'The Archangel' Vannathy (Arch Angel Thai Boxing)
Kayne 'Insane' Conlan (Strikeforce)	UD
Pumipi 'Ceazar' Ngaronoa (Dannevirke Thai Boxing)
Chris 'Butcher Boy' Wells (SMAC)	TKO
Ra 'Razor' Redden (SMAC)	2nd RND
Joey 'The Filipino Kid' Baylon (Elite Thai Boxing)	MD
Nic 'Icecream' Aratema

Semifinals
Alexi 'Phet' Serepisos (Jai Thai Boxing)	SD
Kayne 'Insane' Conlan (Strikeforce)	4 Rnds
Chris 'Butcher Boy' Wells (SMAC)
Joey 'The Filipino Kid' Baylon (Elite Thai Boxing)

Final
Alexi 'Phet' Serepisos (Jai Thai Boxing)	MD
Joey 'The Filipino Kid' Baylon (Elite Thai Boxing)

=== King in the Ring 100+ kg III ===
These Tournaments were competed on 29 August 2015 at ASB Stadium, Auckland, New Zealand. The undercard featured Tom Williams vs Socrates Fernandes, Cody Scott vs Roman Nia, Alexi Serepisos vs Albert Xavier and Brad Riddell vs Michael Badato.

Quarterfinals
Faisal Zakaria (Diamond Flyer Fight & Fitness)	UD
Jordan Maroroa (S.A.L.T)
Paulo Lakai (ETK)	KO
Andrew Kyburz (Strikeforce Canterbury)	1st RND
Felise Leniu (MMA Pound)	UD
Tareq Alawneh (City Kickboxing)
Alex Ofanoa-Siulua (Wild Stables)	SD
Tafa Misipati (ETK)	4th Rnd

Semifinals
Faisal Zakaria (Diamond Flyer Fight & Fitness)	KO
Paulo Lakai (ETK)	1st RND
Felise Leniu (MMA Pound)	KO
Alex Ofanoa-Siulua (Wild Stables)	3rd RND

Final
Paulo Lakai (ETK)	KO
Felise Leniu (MMA Pound)	2nd RND

=== King in the Ring 100 kg II ===
These Tournaments were competed on 31 October 2015 at ASB Stadium, Auckland, New Zealand. The undercard featured Victor Mechkov vs Carlos Hicks, Richard Simpson vs Pati Afoa, Michelle Preston vs Kristan Armstrong, Joey Baylon vs Dayne Williams and Slav Alexeichik vs Matt Saville.

Quarterfinals
Jamie Eades (ETK North)	TKO
Joel Masters (Ultimate Kickboxing)	2nd RND
Hamad Alloush (Team Ezza)	MD
Nato Laauli (ETK HQ)
Dan Roberts (Bulldog Gym)	UD
Wayne Hehea (Wild Stables)
Israel Adesanya (City Kickboxing)	TKO
Nase Foai (Giorgi's Gym)	2nd Rnd

Semifinals
Jamie Eades (ETK North)	UD
Hamad Alloush (Team Ezza)
Dan Roberts (Bulldog Gym)	KO
Israel Adesanya (City Kickboxing)	1st RND

Final
Jamie Eades (ETK North)	UD
Israel Adesanya (City Kickboxing)

=== King in the Ring 75 kg I ===
These Tournaments were competed on 15 April 2016 at ASB Stadium, Auckland, New Zealand. The undercard featured Jeremiah Fatialofa vs Fou Ah-Lam, Junior Coleman vs Tae Park, Mario Williams vs Doug Higgins and Slav Alexeichik vs Jamie Eades.

Quarterfinals
Blood Diamond (CKB)	TKO
David Watts (Toa Fighting Systems)	2nd RND
Victor Mechkov (ETK HQ)	UD
Mikaera Povey (Helensville Thai Boxing)
Chris Eades (ETK Northshore)	UD
Terrence Montgomery (Wild Stables)
Hayden Todd (Strikeforce)	UD
Rua Druce (MTI Wellington)

Semifinals
Blood Diamond (CKB)	MD
Victor Mechkov (ETK HQ)
Chris Eades (ETK Northshore)
Hayden Todd (Strikeforce)	UD

Final
Victor Mechkov (ETK HQ)	SD
Hayden Todd (Strikeforce)

=== King in the Ring 62 kg IV ===
These Tournaments were competed on 27 June 2016 at ASB Stadium, Auckland, New Zealand. The undercard featured Paulo ‘Barbarian’ Lakai vs Ata ‘Smiling Assassin’ Fakalelu, Michelle ‘Pressure’ Preston vs Kim Townsend, WKBF Middleweight World Title Victor Mechkov vs Nick Ariel and Dayne Williams vs Nic ‘Ice Cream’ Aratema.

Quarterfinals
Joey ‘The Filipino Kid’ Baylon	UD
David ‘Sanchai’ Aung	4 rnds
Alexi ‘Phet’ Serepisos†	UD
Nikora Lee-Kingi
Sone ‘Arch Ange’ Vannathy	UD
Kayne ‘Insane’ Conlan
Sam ‘The Shank’ Hill	KO
Chris ‘Butcher Boy’ Wells	3rd RND

Semifinals
Joey ‘The Filipino Kid’ Baylon	TKO
Dayne Williams†	2nd RND
Sone ‘Arch Angel’ Vannathy	UD
Sam ‘The Shank’ Hill

Final
Joey ‘The Filipino Kid’ Baylon	UD
Sone ‘Arch Angel’ Vannathy

† Despite winning the first round, Alexi ‘Phet’ Serepisos could not continue to the semi-finals due to a concussion. Dayne Williams who fought early that night on the undercard, took Serepisos's place in the semi-finals.

=== King in the Ring 92 kg I ===
These Tournaments were competed on 18 November 2016 at ASB Stadium, Auckland, New Zealand. The undercard featured Sigi Pesaleli vs Taylor Matthews, Hayden 'Tat North' Todd vs Victor 'Slick Vic' Mechkov, Beau 'Ruthless' Rawiri vs Eugene 'Evil Genius' Bareman, Chris 'Cobra' Eades vs Blood Diamond and Lightweight World Title Super Fight WKBF Joey 'Filipino' Kid vs Ben Thompson.

Quarterfinals
Davor Matarugic (CKB)	TKO
Geordie 'Gorilla' Bateman (Multi Martial Arts)	2nd RND
Jamie 'Kyokushin Kid' Eades (ETK Northshore)	TKO
Ziggy Croft (City Lee Gar)	2nd RND
Tussi 'Niuean Assassin' Asafo (Grizzly Thai Boxing)	TKO
Ash Solly (CKB)	2nd RND
Fou 'Fabulous' Ah-Lam (ETK)	UD
Jordan 'Le Sifi' Maroroa

Semifinals
Davor Matarugic (CKB)	TKO
Jamie 'Kyokushin Kid' Eades (ETK Northshore)	2nd RND
Ash Solly (CKB)	UD
Fou 'Fabulous' Ah-Lam (ETK)

Final
Davor Matarugic (CKB)
Fou 'Fabulous' Ah-Lam (ETK)

=== The Force ===
King in the Ring promoted their first The Force series. These Tournaments were competed on 7 April 2017 at ASB Stadium, Auckland, New Zealand. The undercard featured Davor Matarugic vs Milos Rastovic, Terrence Montgomery vs Tyrene White and Taalili Wilson vs Jarrod Thompson. The event was commissioned by NZPBA (boxing) and NZMMAF (MMA).

==== Boxing ====
Semifinals
1	Edwin Samy	TKO
4	Jordan Tai	3rd RND
3	Mose Auimatagi Jnr	UD
2	Ivana Siau

Finals
Jordan Tai	UD
Mose Auimatagi Jnr

==== Kickboxing ====
Semifinals
1	Ian Charlton	UD
4	David Aung
3	Sonny Vannathy	UD
2	Alexi Serepisos

Finals
Ian Charlton	TKO
Alexi Serepisos	3rd RND

==== MMA ====
Semifinals
1	Cameron Tukua	SD
4	Sigi Pesaleli
3	Henri Burns	TKO
2	Tafa Mispati	1st RND

Finals
Sigi Pesaleli	TKO
Henri Burns	1st RND

=== King in the Ring 100 kg III ===
The Tournament will be competed on 30 June 2017 at ASB Stadium, Auckland, New Zealand. The undercard featured Moe Hussain vs Fou Ah-Lam, King Assop vs Greg Lemanu and Billy Walker vs Alex Redhead.

Quarterfinals
Ata Fakalelu	UD
Jordan Maroroa
Carlos Ulberg	KO 2nd
Tafa Misipati	1:52
Daniel Tai	UD
Sigi Pesaleli
Dan Kidwell	TKO 1st
Nato Laauli	2:57

Semifinals
Ata Fakalelu	MD
Carlos Ulberg
Daniel Tai	TKO 2nd
Nato Laauli	0:49

Final
Carlos Ulberg	TKO 2nd
Nato Laauli	0:41

=== King in the Ring 68 kg I ===
The Tournament will be competed on 15 September 2017 at ASB Stadium, Auckland, New Zealand. The undercard featured Zoph Bell vs Andre MacDonald, Ben Te Tai vs Ben Petersen and WKBF New Zealand Heavyweight Title bout Taylor Matthews vs Fou Ah-Lam.

Quarterfinals
Ra Redden	UD
Nic Aratema
Josh Marsters	TKO
Zacc Forbes-Smith	1st
Sam Hill	TKO
Shem Murdoch	3rd
Kayne Conlan	UD
Nick Taylor

Semifinals
Ra Redden	TKO
Josh Marsters
Sam Hill	TKO
Kayne Conlan

Final
Josh Marsters	UD
Sam Hill

=== King in the Ring 86 kg IV ===
The Tournament was competed on 17 November 2017 at ASB Stadium, Auckland, New Zealand. The undercard featured Rasy Soth vs Ethan Sudasarna, Pong Chau vs Andre McDonald and vacant WBC Muay Thai World Super Flyweight Title bout Fani Peloumpi vs Michelle Preston.

Quarterfinals
Mose Afoa	UD
Zane Hopman
Geordie Bateman	TKO
Slava Alexeichik	1:35
Ramegus Te Wake	UD
Sigi Pesaleli †
Ash Solly	MD
Edwin Samy

Semifinals
Zane Hopman	SD
Slava Alexeichik
Ramegus Te Wake	TKO
Ash Solly	2:19

Final
Slava Alexeichik	KO
Ash Solly	1:07

† Despite winning the first round, Sigi Pesaleli could not continue to the semi-finals due to injury. Ramegus Te Wake who fought against Pesaleli, took his place in the semi-finals.

=== King in the Ring 100+ kg IV ===
The Tournament was on 23 March 2018 at YMCA Stadium, Auckland, New Zealand. The undercard featured Grant Heka vs Fou 'Fabulous' Ah-Lam, Hone Hepi vs Aaron Rei and Joey Parsons vs Luke Hiki. David Tuitupou wins the tournament

Quarterfinals
Riki Barclay	TKO
Nato Laauli	2nd
Jarrod Thompson
Wayne Hehea
Moe Hussain
Ata Fakalelu
David Tuitupou
James Pascoe

Semifinals
Nato Laauli	TKO
Jarrod Thompson	2nd
Ata Fakalelu
David Tuitupou

Final
Nato Laauli	TKO
David Tuitupou	2nd

=== King in the Ring 75 kg II ===
The Tournament was on 8 June 2018 at Te Rauparaha Arena, Porirua, New Zealand. The undercard featured Zen Neethling vs Dan Robertson, Aaron Cole vs Jon Anderson, Ty Williams vs Tony Angelov and Pettawee Sor Kittachai vs Dominic Reed.

Quarterfinals
Joey Parsons
David Watts
Josh Marsters	TKO
Carlos Hicks
Mike Kapi
Blood Diamond
Rehua Smallman
Victor Mechkov

Semifinals
David Watts
Carlos Hicks
Blood Diamond
Victor Mechkov

Final
Carlos Hicks
Blood Diamond

=== King in the Ring 62 kg V ===
The Tournament was on 9 November 2018 at Barfoot & Thompson Stadium, Auckland, New Zealand. The undercard featured Jordan Maroroa vs Stefan Harrison, Patrick Dittrich vs Fou Ah-Lam, Hayden Todd vs TY Williams and Lara Ahola vs Kelly Broerse.

Quarterfinals
Hermain Perwaisy
Nikora Lee-Kingi
Ben Spears
Joey Baylon
Logan Price
Nic R Aratema
Ale Taumalolo
Dominic Reed

Semifinals
Nikora Lee-Kingi
Ben Spears
Logan Price
Dominic Reed

Final
Nikora Lee-Kingi
Dominic Reed

=== King in the Ring 92 kg II ===
The Tournament was on 30 March 2019 at Barfoot & Thompson Stadium, Auckland, New Zealand. The undercard featured Vahid Unesi vs Salam Hermez, MMA fight Aaron Tau vs Logan Price, Josh Marsters vs Haaimiora Parsons-Grace and TY Williams vs Mandela Ale.

Quarterfinals
Jamie Eades
Des Tana
Fou Ah-Lam
Navajo Stirling
Carlos Ulberg
Julius Poananga
Nato Laauli
Geordie Bateman

Semifinals
Jamie Eades
Fou Ah-Lam
Carlos Ulberg
Nato Laauli

Final
Fou Ah-Lam
Carlos Ulberg

=== King in the Ring 68 kg ===
The Tournament was on 29 June 2019 at Eventfinda Stadium, Auckland, New Zealand. The undercard featured Junior Tupufia vs Iain Clegg, Ollie Schmid vs Hayellom Tesfay, Davor Matarugic vs Fou Ah-Lam.

Quarterfinals
Shem Murdoch
Arshia Ebadi
Thomas Maguren
Jordan Syme
Ale Taumalolo
Yassin Yass
Gene Elbourne
Josh Marsters

Semifinals
Arshia Ebadi
Thomas Maguren†
Ale Taumalolo
Josh Marsters

Final
Arshia Ebadi
Josh Masters

† Despite winning the first round, Jordan Syme could not continue to the semi-finals due to injury. Thomas Maguren who fought against Syme, took his place in the semi-finals.

=== King in the Ring 86 kg ===
The Tournament was on 6 September 2019 at Palmerston North, New Zealand. The undercard featured Jasmine Kiihfuss vs Tessa Key, Blair McDonald vs Anton Simeon, Aaron Arnott vs Peter Gordon, Swade Wallace vs Stacey Te Kuru, Jacob Whawell vs Corey Dunn and David Tuitupou vs Moe Hussain.

Quarterfinals
Zeke Thompson
Geordie Bateman
Hayden Todd
Cole Davids
Mandela Ale
Stefan Harrison
TY Williams
Mose Afoa

Semifinals
Hayden Todd
Zeke Thompson
TY Williams
Mandela Ale

Final
TY Williams
Hayden Todd

=== King in the Ring 75 kg III ===
The Tournament was on 18 July 2020 at North Shore, New Zealand. The undercard featured Ajay Alsaeed vs Sam Parkes, Devan Syme vs Andre MacDonald, Jeeta Prasad vs Natalie Mackey, Hayellom Tesday vs Jordan Smart, Mark Timms vs Hayden Todd.

Quarterfinals
Oscar Remihana	UD
Nick Taylor
Terrence Montgomery	UD
Haamiora Parsons-Grace
Blood Diamond	TKO
Mike Kapi
Arshia Ebadi
Jesse Morrow-Wilson

Semifinals
Oscar Remihana
Terrence Montgomery
Arshia Ebadi
Blood Diamond

Final
Terrence Montgomery
Blood Diamond	UD

=== King in the Ring 62VI ===
The Tournament was on 2 October 2020 at North Shore, New Zealand. The undercard featured Eden Phillips vs Tyer Hedley, Nate Law vs Elijah Taufuiaavalu and David Tuitupoa vs Thomas Peato.

Quarterfinals
Craig Hughes	TKO
Dominic Reed
Rasy Soth	UD
Yassin Yass
Andre MacDonald	TKO
Nikora Lee-Kingi
Prasanth Guda	UD
David Aung

Semifinals
Dominic Reed	TKO
Yassin Yass
Nikora Lee-Kingi	UD
David Aung

Final
Dominic Reed	SD
Nikora Lee-Kingi

=== King in the Ring 92III ===
The Tournament was on 5 December 2020 at North Shore, New Zealand. The undercard featured Haamiora Parsons-Grace vs Victor Meckov, Professional boxing bout between Shiva Mishra vs Aung Sanda, and Lola Ferber vs Audrey Guyet.

Quarterfinals
Robel Haliu
Robert Ngari Dean
Jason King
Navajo Stirling
Cameron Rowston
Vahid Unesi
Viliami Tutone
Nato La'auli

Semifinals
Robert Ngari Dean
Navajo Stirling
Cameron Rowston
Nato La'auli

Final
Navajo Stirling
Nato La'auli

=== King in the Ring 68III ===
The Tournament was on 27 March 2021 at North Shore, New Zealand. The undercard featured Shem 'Money' Murdoch vs Ben 'Brawla' Sisam, Nyrene 'Neutron Bomb' Crowley vs Ayisha 'Baby Mumble' Abied, and Mike "Blood Diamond" winning the World Kickboxing Federation World light heavyweight title against Diego Beneduzzi.

Quarterfinals
Jon Anderson	TKO
Rob Horrocks	2nd
Yury Mamic	TKO
Doug Higgins	3rd
Connar Wilson	KO
Adam Manisy	1st
Tony Jaggard	MD
Kayne Conlan

Semifinals
Rob Horrocks	TKO
Yury Mamic	1st
Adam Manisy	UD
Kayne Conlan

Final
Rob Horrocks	UD
Kayne Conlan

=== King in the Ring 100IV ===
The Tournament was on 19 June 2021 at The Eventfinda Stadium, Auckland, New Zealand. The undercard featured Nick Thornton vs Alex Sorenson and Ayisha Abied vs Wendy Talbot.

Quarterfinals
James Craughwell	KO
Viliame Tutone	R1
Pane Haraki	UPD
Eli Taito
Joel Martin	KO
Navajo Stirling	R2
Nato Laauli	TKO
Rini LeComte	R1

Semifinals
James Craughwell	UPD
Pane Haraki
Rini LeComte	TKO
Navajo Stirling	R2

Final
Navajo Stirling	UPD
James Craughwell

=== King in the Ring 86V ===
The Tournament was on 12 February 2022 at The Eventfinda Stadium, Auckland, New Zealand. The undercard featured Corey Dunn, Alex Sorensen, Tony Jaggard, Marcus Heywood, Lio Iloilo and David Tuitupou.

Quarterfinals
Robert Ngari-Dean	TKO
Tony Angelov	R2
Mark Timms	UPD
Mike Kapi
Nathan Matafeo	UPD
Cameron Rowston
Pane Haraki	TKO
Connor Woodman	R2

Semifinals
Robert Ngari-Dean	MPD
Mark Timms
Connor Woodman	UPD
Cameron Rowston

Final
Cameron Rowston	TKO
Robert Ngari-Dean	R2

=== King in the Ring 72IV ===
The Tournament was on 11 June 2022 at The Eventfinda Stadium, Auckland, New Zealand. The undercard featured Jason Khan, Greg Lemanu, Mark Timms, Chris Eades, Yassin Yass, Dominic Reed, Kurt Douglas and Navajo Stirling.

Quarterfinals
Mike Kapi	TKO
Zacc Forbes-Smith	R1
Corin Braddick	SPD
Oscar Remihana
Charlie Baker	TKO
Jon Anderson	R1
Jorge Cordente	TKO
Tonny Jaggard	R2

Semifinals
Mike Kapi	TKO
Corin Braddick	R1
Jon Anderson	KO
Tony Jaggard	R1

Final
Tony Jaggard	KO
Mike Kapi	R2

=== King in the Ring SUPERV ===
The Tournament was on 9 November 2022 at The Eventfinda Stadium, Auckland, New Zealand. The undercard featured Mandela Ale, Mark Timms, Byron Pointon, Oscar Remihana, Jesse Astill, Navajo Stirling, Phalanluk Kongsang and Michelle Preston.

Quarterfinals
David Tuitupou	SPD
Earl-Jay Pehi
Brando Pericic	TKO
Thomas Peato	R1
Dominic Scanlan	TKO
Nathaneal Tuteru	R2
Lee Kara	UPD
Moe Hussain

Semifinals
David Tuitupou	TKO
Brando Pericic	R2
Nathaneal Tuteru	UPD
Moe Hussain

Final
David Tuitupou	UPD
Moe Hussain

== Rules ==
=== Permitted techniques ===
- All western style boxing techniques
- Spinning backfists
- All eastern and western kickboxing techniques with use of foot and knee
- Kicking inside outside leg kicks
- Grabbing neck with two hands and throwing only one knee to body or head is allowed. Fighter can continue to knee with one hand only
- When fighter attempts to throw body kick, opponent can counter by grabbing leg, and may strike only once while holding leg
- Flying knees to the head and body

=== Forbidden techniques ===
- Hammer punch
- Hitting with inside of glove
- Punching or striking to opponent's groin
- Punching opponent’s kidneys and neck
- Elbows to head and body
- Kicking or punching opponent's back
- Kicking and punching while on floor
- Speaking during fight
- Biting/holding opponent's arm
- Headbutting or throwing the opponent
- Strikes to joints or spine
- Kicking and punching after referee has instructed the contestant to stop round
