= Antz Nansen =

New Zealand martial artist

- Born: Anthony Nansen; 12 March 1983 (age 43); Māngere, New Zealand
- Other names: Notorious
- Nationality: New Zealand
- Height: 5 ft 10 in (178 cm)
- Weight: 220 lb (100 kg; 15 st 10 lb)
- Division: Light heavyweight
- Style: Kickboxing, boxing
- Stance: Orthodox
- Fighting out of: Auckland, New Zealand
- Team: Elite Thai Kickboxing Smac Gym
- Trainer: Jason Suttie
- Years active: 2004–2022

Professional boxing record
- Total: 7
- Wins: 4
- By knockout: 1
- Losses: 3
- By knockout: 1
- Draws: 0

Kickboxing record
- Total: 30
- Wins: 27
- By knockout: 12
- Losses: 3
- Draws: 0

Mixed martial arts record
- Total: 2
- Wins: 1
- By knockout: 1
- Losses: 1
- By submission: 1

Other information
- Notable relatives: Ray Sefo, cousin Fai Falamoe, cousin Baby Nansen, Sister
- Boxing record from BoxRec
- Mixed martial arts record from Sherdog
- Last updated on: 9 December 2012

Anthony "Antz" Nansen (born 12 March 1983) is a New Zealand professional boxer, kickboxer and mixed martial artist.

== Career ==
Nansen practised kung fu as a child and grew up playing rugby league. He began training in kickboxing at the age of 21. He is the cousin of Ray Sefo. He holds a professional kickboxing record of 22 wins and 3 loss, and has been the kickboxing champion of New Zealand in three different weight classes. He defeated Joel Martin in October 2008 to become the World Kickboxing Federation (WKBF) Heavyweight Kickboxing Champion of New Zealand.

On 23 September 2009, he made his mixed martial arts debut against Olympic judoka Hiroshi Izumi at World Victory Road Presents: Sengoku 10 in Saitama, Japan. Nansen was able to control the fight with his striking and won via technical knockout in the first round.

The following year, on 25 April, Nansen took part in his second MMA bout at ASTRA: Yoshida's Farewell against jiu-jitsu fighter Enson Inoue, who was making his return to the ring after six years of retirement. Inoue used his superior grappling skills to win via submission by using an armbar in round 1.

He was then set to face Satoshi Ishii, another of Japan's Olympic judoka, at the K-1 World MAX 2010. However, Nansen was unable to compete

== Titles ==
- 2013 King in the Ring KickBoxing HeavyWeight 100 kg Class Champion
- 2011 WKBF World Heavyweight Kickboxing Champion
- 2011 King in the Ring KickBoxing HeavyWeight 100 kg Class Champion
- IMF Heavyweight Muay Thai Champion of New Zealand
- WKBF Super Heavyweight Muay Thai Champion of New Zealand
- WKBF Heavyweight Kickboxing Champion of New Zealand
- WKBF Super Cruiserweight Kickboxing Champion of New Zealand

== Boxing record ==
4 Wins (1 knockout 2 decisions), 3 Loss, 0 Draws
| Res. | Record | Opponent | Type | Rd., Time | Date | Location | Notes |
| Loss | 4-3 | (United Kingdom) Michael Sprott | UD | 3 (3) | 4 June 2014 | Auckland, New Zealand | Super 8 Heavyweight Tournament - Semi Final 1 |
| Win | 4-2 | (United States) Hasim Rahman | UD | 3 (3) | 4 June 2014 | Auckland, New Zealand | Super 8 Heavyweight Tournament - Quarter Final 1 |
| Loss | 3-2 | (New Zealand) Junior Maletino Iakopo | MD | 4 (4) | 20 September 2013 | Auckland, New Zealand | |
| Loss | 3-1 | (Samoa) Seiaute Mailata | KO | 1 (4) | 16 September 2008 | Otara, New Zealand | |
| Win | 3-0 | (New Zealand) Sean Sullivan | MD | 3, 3:00 | 1 December 2007 | Ellerslie, New Zealand | |
| Win | 2-0 | (New Zealand) Shane Old | TKO (corner stoppage) | 2 (3) | 5 May 2007 | Ellerslie, New Zealand | |
| Win | 1-0 | (New Zealand) Jeff Seedy | UD | 3, 2:00 | 2 December 2006 | Ellerslie, New Zealand | Professional boxing debut. |

== Kickboxing record ==
Kickboxing record
27 wins, 3 losses
| Date | Result | Opponent | Event | Location | Method | Round | Time | Notes |
| 30 August 2014 | Win | (Australia) Alofa Solitua | The King in the Ring | Auckland, New Zealand | TKO | 3 | | |
| 11 November 2013 | Win | (New Zealand) Nato Laauli | The King in the Ring 7 | Auckland, New Zealand | Decision (unanimous) | 3 | 3:00 | Wins King in the Ring 8-man tournament |
| 11 November 2013 | Win | (New Zealand) Pane Haraki | The King in the Ring 7 | Auckland, New Zealand | Decision (unanimous) | 3 | 3:00 | Semi Finals |
| 11 November 2013 | Win | (New Zealand) Dan Stirling | The King in the Ring 7 | Auckland, New Zealand | Decision (unanimous) | 3 | 3:00 | Quarter Finals |
| 13 July 2013 | Win | (Sudan) Faisal Zakaria | The King in the Ring MAX72 | Auckland, New Zealand | TKO (corner stoppage) | 3 | | |
| 17 November 2012 | Loss | (Poland) Paul Slowinski | Knees of Fury 39 | Adelaide, Australia | KO (kick to the body) | 2 | N/A | |
| 2011 | Win | (Australia) Erik Nosa | King in the Ring MAX | Auckland, New Zealand | TKO | 4 | | Wins WKBF World Heavyweight Championship. |
| 28 May 2011 | Win | (New Zealand) Josh Heta | King in the Ring | Auckland, New Zealand | Decision (unanimous) | 3 | 3:00 | Tournament final. |
| 28 May 2011 | Win | (New Zealand) Henry Taani | King in the Ring | Auckland, New Zealand | Decision (unanimous) | 3 | 3:00 | Tournament semi-final. |
| 28 May 2011 | Win | (New Zealand) Junior Ioane | King in the Ring | Auckland, New Zealand | TKO (corner stoppage) | 1 | 3:00 | Tournament quarter-final. |
| 26 February 2011 | Loss | (New Zealand) Tony Angelov | Philip Lam Promotions | Auckland, New Zealand | Decision (unanimous) | 5 | 3:00 | For WMC New Zealand Heavyweight title. |
| 20 November 2010 | Loss | (France) Souleimane Konaté | Philip Lam Promotions "NZ vs Australia & France" | Auckland, New Zealand | Decision (unanimous) | 5 | 3:00 | |
| 18 October 2008 | Win | (New Zealand) Joel Martin | New Zealand Kickboxers | Auckland, New Zealand | KO (knee to the body) | 1 | 0:35 | Wins WKBF New Zealand Heavyweight title. |
| 23 February 2008 | Win | (New Zealand) Jon Gallia | Philip Lam Promotions | Auckland, New Zealand | KO (right hooks) | 1 | 1:02 | Wins WKBF New Zealand Super Cruiserweight title. |
| 2004 | Loss | (New Zealand) Tony Angelov | Main Event Fights | New Zealand | Decision | 3 | 3:00 | Professional kickboxing debut. |
Legend: Win Loss Draw/No contest

== Mixed martial arts record ==
Professional record breakdown
| 2 matches | 1 win | 1 loss |
| By knockout | 1 | 0 |
| By submission | 0 | 1 |

| Res. | Record | Opponent | Method | Event | Date | Round | Time | Location | Notes |
|---|---|---|---|---|---|---|---|---|---|
| Loss | 1–1 | Enson Inoue | Submission (armbar) | Astra | 25 April 2010 | 1 | 2:10 | Tokyo, Japan | |
| Win | 1–0 | Hiroshi Izumi | TKO (punches) | World Victory Road Presents: Sengoku 10 | 23 September 2009 | 1 | 2:56 | Saitama, Saitama, Japan | |
