= Karin Nansen =

Uruguayan Activist

- Citizenship: Uruguayan
- Occupation: Activist

Karin Nansen is an activist from Uruguay. In 1988, she was the founding member of REDES/Friends of the Earth Uruguay. She became the Chair of Friends of the Earth International in 2016; her two terms ended in June 2021.
