= Nansen Island (disambiguation) =

Nansen Island may refer to:

- Nansen Island (Antarctica)
- Nansen Island (Franz Josef Land)
- Nansen Island (Kara Sea)

== See also ==
- Nansen Land
