= Big Ask (campaign) =

Environmental campaign

The Big Ask was a campaign by Friends of the Earth calling for a new climate change law in the United Kingdom and 15 other EU member states. The United Kingdom Government announced the introduction of the Climate Change Bill in the Queen's Speech on 15 November 2006. This was after 130,000 people across the country had asked their MP to support such a bill. Radiohead frontman Thom Yorke was a spokesperson for the campaign.

== UK Climate Change Bill ==
This law is intended to tackle the main cause of climate change — emissions of carbon dioxide gas.

The law that Friends of the Earth are called for would require the UK Government to cut the amounts of carbon dioxide being released by 3% year on year.

The Big Ask reasoning was:

- All the major political parties say climate change is the biggest threat we face
- They all have ambitious targets for cutting carbon dioxide (20% by 2010, 60% by 2050)
- Yet emissions of carbon dioxide in the UK keep on rising
- The UK needs to show leadership in showing that climate change can be tackled
- The Climate Change Bill is the best way of doing this

== Draft bill ==
The Government has now produced a Draft Climate Change Bill with a closing date for responses on 12 June 2007. The Big Ask Campaign has entered its next stage and is campaigning to make the Bill stronger than the Draft Bill. People are being asked to lobby their MPs again to ask them to support a Bill that will:

- reduce emissions every year so the UK reaches a target of at least 80% cuts by 2050
- include annual targets so politicians can't blame preceding Governments for missed targets
- include emissions from international aviation and shipping

== Big Ask Web March ==
In 2007 the Big Ask has created a Big Ask Web March. People are invited to upload short video clips calling for a strong Climate Change Bill.

== See also ==
- Climate change in the United Kingdom
