= Barfoot & Thompson Stadium =

Stadium in New Zealand

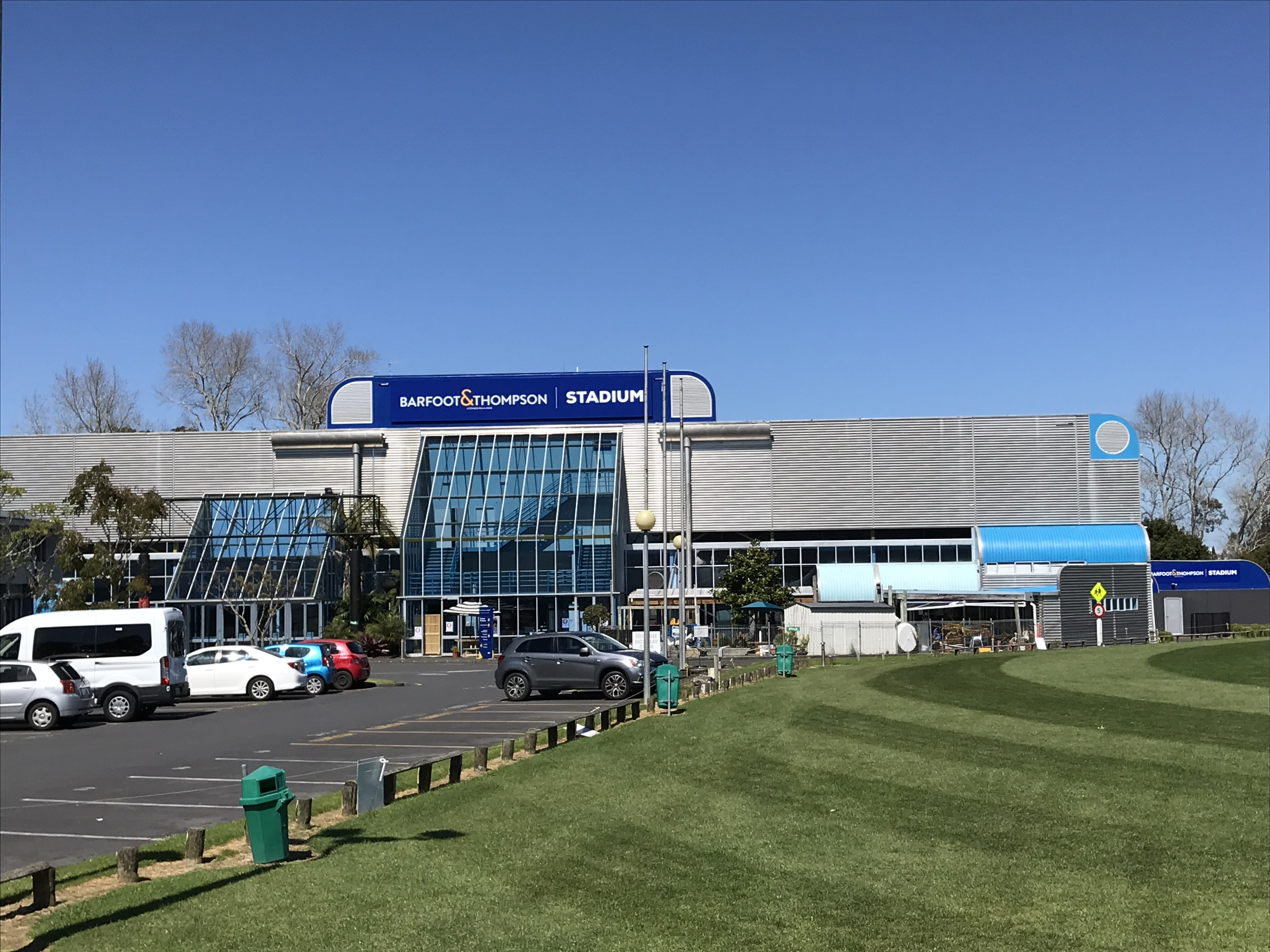
- Interactive map of Barfoot & Thompson Stadium
- Former names: ASB Stadium
- Address: Selwyn College Grounds, Kohimarama Road, 1071, New Zealand
- Coordinates: 36.8612967°S 174.8357959°E
- Capacity: 3700
- Type: Multi-purpose Indoor Facility
- Scoreboard: East City Community Trust

Construction
- Opened: 1 July 1987; 39 years ago

Website
- www.barfootstadium.co.nz

Barfoot & Thompson Stadium (formerly ASB Stadium and Chase Stadium), is a New Zealand venue for sports and entertainment events in Kohimarama, Auckland, New Zealand. The name sponsorship by Barfoot & Thompson, a leading real estate company, began in 2018. Barfoot & Thompson Stadium is a training and competition venue for many local clubs and organisations including East City Futsal Indoor Soccer Club, Auckland Ultimate, Auckland Basketball, Sparta Volleyball Club, Orakei Tigers Basketball Club, Howick & St Heliers Judo Club, Aikido Auckland Aikikai and many more. The venue has many other facilities as well, including a preschool, gym, physio therapy, after school care and school holiday programme, and is located on Selwyn College.

== Board of trustees ==
Barfoot & Thompson Stadium is administered under a Trust Deed by a Board of Trustees. The East City Community Trust is a fully constituted Charitable Trust made up of three members namely:

Selwyn College (Ministry of Education), Barfoot & Thompson Stadium Sports Clubs, and the local community represented by the Ōrākei Local Board.

The current Trustees are:

- Sheryll Ofner (Chairperson) – Principal of Selwyn College
- Barbara Gwilliam (Trustee) – Barfoot & Thompson Stadium Sports Clubs
- David Wong (Trustee) – Community representative from the Ōrākei Local Board
- Mark Anderson (Trustee)

== Kickboxing and boxing ==
Barfoot & Thompson Stadium has been the host for over a hundred kickboxing and boxing events. Most notable events include

- Over 15 King in the Ring Kickboxing tournaments since 2011
- Jimmy Thunder vs Craig Petersen for the Australian heavyweight title (1992, Pro boxing)
- Sonni Michael Angelo vs Maselino Masoe for the vacant WBO Asia Pacific super middleweight title (2008, Pro boxing)
- Shane Cameron vs Colin Wilson for the Vacant Australasian Heavyweight Title (2005, Pro boxing)

== Commonwealth Games ==
The Stadium (known as the Chase Stadium at the time) played host to gymnastics events at the 1990 Commonwealth Games.
