= Pro Box NZ =

Pro Box New Zealand Association
- Sport: Professional boxing
- Jurisdiction: New Zealand
- Abbreviation: Pro Box NZ
- Founded: 2012
- Affiliation: World Boxing Council; Australian National Boxing Federation; International Boxing Organization
- President: Torchy George
- (New Zealand)

Pro Box New Zealand Association (Pro Box NZ) is one of the four governing bodies for the sport of professional boxing in New Zealand. Pro Box NZ is a non-profit organisation.

== History ==
Pro Box NZ was founded in 2012 by Torchy George located in Hamilton, New Zealand. The organisation was a small organisation at first only doing two to four events a year in Waikato and Bay of Plenty area. Steve Scott became president of the organisation in 2018. Since Scott became president, he turned the organisation into a nationwide organisation and becoming direct competitors of the other major organisations in New Zealand.

== Current roles ==
=== Board members ===
President: Torchy George

== Current national champions ==
=== Men ===
Weight class:	NZPBA Champion:	NZPBA Reign began:
Heavyweight	Kiki Toa Leutele	12 May 2023
Cruiserweight	Kyle Merewether	14 November 2026
Light-heavyweight	Zane Hopman	30 October 2020
Super-middleweight	Francis Waitai	10 October 2020
Middleweight	Andrei Mikhailovich	3 August 2019
Super-welterweight	Bowyn Morgan	15 December 2018
Welterweight	Vacant	—
Super-lightweight	Shiva Mishra	15 February 2020
Lightweight	Vacant	—

=== Female ===
Weight class:	Pro Box NZ Champion:	Pro Box NZ Reign began:
Heavyweight	Sequita Hemingway	19 August 2023
Light Heavyweight	Lani Daniels	24 June 2022
Super Middleweight	Lani Daniels	22 September 2018
Welterweight	Macca Jean	7 October 2023
Lightweight	Jadene Treadaway	21 March 2026

== Current provincial champions ==
=== Inter-Island title ===
==== Cruiserweight Men ====
Name	Beginning of Reign	Opponent	Defences
Kurt Winklemann	24 November 2018	Nigel Elliot	0

=== South Island title ===
==== Cruiserweight Men ====
Name	Beginning of Reign	Title	Opponent
Izic Placid	3 May 2019	Pro Box NZ	Ash Mcconville

==== Super Middleweight Men ====
Name	Beginning of Reign	Title	Opponent
Joshua Hatherley	24 November 2018	Pro Box NZ	Michael Pascoe

== Regional Champions ==
=== Pacific Titles ===
==== Cruiserweight title ====
Name	Beginning of Reign	Title	Opponent
Patrick Ferguson	18 August 2018	Pro Box Pacific	Panuve Helu

==== Light Heavyweight title ====
Name	Beginning of Reign	Title	Opponent
Savenaca Naliva	29 February 2020	Pro Box Pacific	John Korake

==== Super Middleweight title ====
Name	Beginning of Reign	Title	Opponent
Tyson Turner	9 November 2019	Pro Box Pacific	Zac Cotten

==== Middleweight Pacific title ====
Name	Beginning of Reign	Title	Opponent
Gunnar Jackson	24 November 2018	Pro Box Pacific	Blake Bell

==== Super Welterweight title ====
Name	Beginning of Reign	Title	Opponent
Bowyn Morgan	4 May 2018	Pro Box Pacific	Andres Delfin Rodriguez

==== Super Lightweight title ====
Name	Beginning of Reign	Title	Opponent
Cairo George	4 May 2019	Pro Box Pacific	James Torres
Shiva Mishra	31 October 2020	Pro Box Pacific	Tain Cropley

==== Super Featherweight title ====
Name	Beginning of Reign	Title	Opponent
Baolin Kang	11 September 2019	Pro Box Pacific	Cain Brunton

== See also ==
- List of New Zealand female boxing champions
- List of New Zealand heavyweight boxing champions
- List of New Zealand cruiserweight boxing champions
- List of New Zealand light heavyweight boxing champions
- List of New Zealand super middleweight boxing champions
- List of New Zealand middleweight boxing champions
- List of New Zealand super welterweight boxing champions
- List of New Zealand welterweight boxing champions
- List of New Zealand super lightweight boxing champions
- List of New Zealand lightweight boxing champions
- List of New Zealand super featherweight boxing champions
- List of New Zealand featherweight boxing champions
- List of New Zealand bantamweight boxing champions
