= Professional boxing in New Zealand =

- Governing body: Boxing NZ; NZNBF; NZPBA Inc; PBCNZ; Pro Box NZ

Professional boxing in New Zealand refers to the sport of boxing held in New Zealand at a professional level.

== Governing body ==
New Zealand National Boxing Federation (NZNBF) and New Zealand Professional Boxing Association (NZPBA) are the national sporting commissioning bodies that run professional boxing in New Zealand. Other boxing bodies in New Zealand have been inactive including Boxing NZ Inc and New Zealand Boxing Council (NZBC). Boxing NZ Inc currently only commission amateur boxing events and NZBC has been inactive since 2007. The New Zealand Boxing Association (NZBA) was the first boxing commission in New Zealand, which began before 1900. In 1903, the NZBA was granted a special dispensation by the ruling world amateur body to conduct professional boxing. Thus was born the amateur undercard with pro bouts as the main card. In 2016, a New Boxing commission started called the Professional Boxing Commission New Zealand (PBCNZ). The PBCNZ commissioned their first show on Joseph Parker vs. Andy Ruiz. A small commissioning body called Pro-Box NZ (established in 2012), is semi active in New Zealand, however only does an average of three events per year. Most of Pro-Box NZ commissioned events are in the Bay of Plenty and Waikato area. In 2019, NZPBA was no longer considered the main professional boxing body as Pro Box NZ did more shows nationwide the NZPBA. PBCNZ was the main body for Auckland.

== History ==
In 1903 Parliament formed and passed the Boxing and Wrestling Act to cover the facets and the issuing of a Police boxing permit. The act and regulations have been slightly amended over the years. The latest amendment was 1984, because only boxing and wrestling is named in the current act and regulations, is why all the other combat sports do not have to apply for Police permits or restricted by anything else such that is required for current day boxers.

== Tournaments ==
- Super Eight Boxing Tournament

== Current champions ==
=== Men ===
Weight class:	NZPBA Champion:	NZPBA Reign began:	PBCNZ Champion:	PBCNZ Reign began:	Pro Box NZ Champion:	Pro Box NZ Reign began:
Heavyweight	Junior Fa	18 March 2017	Richard Tutaki	28 October 2023	Kiki Toa Leutele	12 May 2023
Cruiserweight	Asher Derbyshire	29 April 2016	Jerome Pampellone	21 July 2022	Kyle Merewether	14 November 2026
Light Heavyweight	Vacant	—	Michael Helg	8 June 2024	Zane Hopman	30 October 2020
Super Middleweight	Ricaia Warren	15 November 2025	Vacant	—	Francis Waitai	10 October 2020
Middleweight	Vacant	—	Marcus Heywood	20 August 2022	Andrei Mikhailovich	3 August 2019
Super Welterweight	Bowyn Morgan	22 June 2018	Dylan Archer	25 July 2024	Bowyn Morgan	15 December 2018
Welterweight	Vacant	—	Sonny Morini	14 November 2025	Vacant	—
Super Lightweight	Vacant	—	Vacant	—	Shiva Mishra	15 February 2020
Lightweight	Nort Beauchamp	4 May 2019	Vacant	—	Vacant	—

=== Female ===
Weight class:	NZPBA Champion:	NZPBA Reign began:	PBCNZ Champion:	PBCNZ Reign began:	Pro Box NZ Champion:	Pro Box NZ Reign began:
Heavyweight	Sarah Long	13 October 2018	Vacant	—	Sequita Hemingway	19 August 2023
Cruiserweight	N/A	—	Tinta Smith	11 May 2024	N/A	—
Light Heavyweight	Lani Daniels	18 November 2017	Stacey Loye	20 November 2026	Lani Daniels	24 June 2022
Super Middleweight	Tema Takau	20 November 2026	Vacant	—	Lani Daniels	22 September 2018
Super Welterweight	Daniella Smith	6 May 2006	Vacant	—	Vacant	—
Welterweight	Daniella Smith	13 December 2008	Vacant	—	Macca Jean	7 October 2023
Super Lightweight	Vacant	—	Mea Motu	3 July 2021	Vacant	—
Lightweight	Mea Motu	26 March 2021	Quinita Hati	19 May 2018	Jadene Treadaway	21 March 2026
Super Featherweight	Rebecca Jennings	10 September 2016	Mea Motu	30 April 2022	Vacant	—
Featherweight	Vacant	—	Mea Motu	12 February 2022	Vacant	—
Bantamweight	Christine Gillespie	2 November 2024	Vacant	—	Vacant	—

== Pacific Titles ==
In 2018, Pro Box NZ created a new title for the pacific region called the Pro Box Pacific title, with the first bout happening on 4 May 2018 with Bowyn Morgan taking on Andres Delfin Rodriguez. PBCNZ tried to replicate the idea, however the original bout scheduled on 19 May 2018, between Sam Rapira and Abhay Chand did not happen due to Abhay Chand pulling out. Sam Rapira ended up fighting Ratu Dawai instead for the PBCNZ National Titles.

=== Cruiserweight Pacific title ===
Name	Beginning of Reign	Title	Opponent
Patrick Ferguson	18 August 2018	Pro Box Pacific	Panuve Helu

=== Light Heavyweight Pacific title ===
Name	Beginning of Reign	Title	Opponent
Savenaca Naliva	29 February 2020	Pro Box Pacific	John Korake

=== Super Middleweight Pacific title ===
Name	Beginning of Reign	Title	Opponent
Tyson Turner	9 November 2019	Pro Box Pacific	Zac Cotten

=== Middleweight Pacific title ===
Name	Beginning of Reign	Title	Opponent
Gunnar Jackson	24 November 2018	Pro Box Pacific	Blake Bell

=== Super Welterweight Pacific title ===
Name	Beginning of Reign	Title	Opponent
Bowyn Morgan	4 May 2018	Pro Box Pacific	Andres Delfin Rodriguez

=== Super Lightweight Pacific title ===
Name	Beginning of Reign	Title	Opponent
Cairo George	4 May 2019	Pro Box Pacific	James Torres
Shiva Mishra	31 October 2020	Pro Box Pacific	Tain Cropley

=== Super Featherweight Pacific title ===
Name	Beginning of Reign	Title	Opponent
Baolin Kang	11 September 2019	Pro Box Pacific	Cain Brunton

== Provincial titles ==
In 2018, New Zealand Professional Boxing Association created three Provincial titles for New Zealand. The NZPBA Northern, NZPBA Central and NZPBA Southern title. The first title was competed on 6 October 2018, where Kiki Toa Leutele Knocked out Thomas Russell.

=== Heavyweight title ===
==== Heavyweight Central title ====
Name	Beginning of Reign	Title	Opponent
Harry Kaing	6 December 1886	Wanganui title	John Laurie
Kiki Toa Leutele	6 October 2018	NZPBA Central	Thomas Russell

==== Heavyweight Southern title ====
Name	Beginning of Reign	Title	Opponent	Defence
Bill Bartlett	13 December 1912	Canterbury title	William O'Bien	1

=== Cruiserweight title ===
==== Cruiserweight Southern title ====
Name	Beginning of Reign	Title	Opponent
Izic Placid	3 May 2019	Pro Box NZ South Island	Ash Mcconville
Kurt Winklemann	24 November 2018	Pro Box NZ Inter-Island title	Nigel Elliot

=== Super Middleweight title ===
==== Super Middleweight Southern title ====
Name	Beginning of Reign	Title	Opponent
Joshua Hatherley	24 November 2018	Pro Box NZ South Island	Michael Pascoe

=== Middleweight title ===
==== Middleweight Northern title ====
Name	Beginning of Reign	Title	Opponent	defences
John Laurie	10 September 1886	Auckland title	James Martin	1
Barney Donovan	22 September 1886	Auckland title	John Laurie	1

==== Middleweight Central title ====
Name	Beginning of Reign	Title	Opponent
Gunnar Jackson	24 November 2018	NZPBA Central	Blake Bell

==== Middleweight Southern title ====
Name	Beginning of Reign	Title	Opponent	Defences
John Laurie	5 June 1886	West Coast title	J J Breeze	1
Fred Millar	20 August 1887	West Coast title	John Laurie	1
John Laurie	17 September 1887	West Coast title	Fred Millar	0

=== Lightweight title ===
==== Lightweight Northern title ====
Name	Beginning of Reign	Title	Opponent	defences
Torpedo Billy Murphy	14 July 1883	Auckland title	Frank Burns	2
Barney Donovan	5 January 1885	Auckland title	Torpedo Billy Murphy	1

== See also ==
- List of New Zealand world boxing champions
- List of New Zealand female boxing champions
- List of New Zealand heavyweight boxing champions
- List of New Zealand cruiserweight boxing champions
- List of New Zealand light heavyweight boxing champions
- List of New Zealand super middleweight boxing champions
- List of New Zealand middleweight boxing champions
- List of New Zealand super welterweight boxing champions
- List of New Zealand welterweight boxing champions
- List of New Zealand super lightweight boxing champions
- List of New Zealand lightweight boxing champions
- List of New Zealand super featherweight boxing champions
- List of New Zealand featherweight boxing champions
- List of New Zealand bantamweight boxing champions
- List of Australian female boxing champions
- List of Australian heavyweight boxing champions
- List of Australian cruiserweight boxing champions
- List of Australian light heavyweight boxing champions
- List of Australian super middleweight boxing champions
- List of Australian middleweight boxing champions
- List of Australian super welterweight boxing champions
- List of Australian welterweight boxing champions
- List of Australian super lightweight boxing champions
- List of Australian lightweight boxing champions
- List of Australian super featherweight boxing champions
- List of Australian featherweight boxing champions
- List of Australian bantamweight boxing champions
- Boxing in Australia
