= List of New Zealand super middleweight boxing champions =

This list of New Zealand super middleweight boxing champions is a table showing the boxers who have won the New Zealand professional super middleweight championship.

The title has been administered by the Pro Box NZ, New Zealand Boxing Association, New Zealand National Boxing Federation, New Zealand Professional Boxing Association and New Zealand Boxing Council since 1990.

A champion will often voluntarily relinquish the title in order to fight for a higher-ranked championship, such as the world. Where the date on which a champion relinquished the title is unclear.

| Name | Reign | Duration of reign | Title | Defences | Note |
|---|---|---|---|---|---|
| James Jimmy Higgins | 1 | 22 August 1990 – 1 July 1991 | New Zealand Boxing Association | 1 | |
| Rudi Filipovic | 1 | 1 July 1991 – 26 November 1993 | New Zealand Boxing Association | 2 | Filipovic retired after defending the title on 26 November 1993. |
| Gerrard Zohs | 1 | 29 September 1994 | New Zealand Boxing Association | 1 | Zohs relinquished title without defending it. |
| Jason Rarere | 1 | 23 March 1995 | New Zealand Boxing Council | 1 | |
| Mike Makata | 1 | 12 October 1995 – 7 November 1998 | New Zealand Boxing Association | 3 | |
| Sam Leuii | 1 | 7 November 1998 | New Zealand Boxing Association | 0 | Leuii also won the vacant IBF Pan Pacific super middleweight title. |
| Norm Graham | 1 | 24 August 2001 | New Zealand Professional Boxing Association | 0 | |
| Sean Sullivan | 1 | 29 November 2001 | New Zealand Boxing Association | 1 | Sean Sullivan successfully defended the title on 12 April 2002 |
| Lee Oti | 1 | 29 April 2004 | New Zealand Boxing Association | 0 | |
| Sosaia Vaka | 1 | 29 March 2007 | New Zealand National Boxing Federation | 0 | |
| Maselino Masoe | 1 | 28 June 2008 | New Zealand National Boxing Federation | 0 | |
| Gunnar Jackson | 1 | 31 March 2012 – 5 April 2013 | New Zealand Professional Boxing Association | 2 | |
| Isaac Peach | 1 | 1 June 2012 | New Zealand National Boxing Federation | 0 | |
| Adrian Taihia | 1 | 5 April 2013 | New Zealand Professional Boxing Association | 1 | Taihia last defence was on 22 March 2014 |
| Jordan Tai | 1 | 25 February 2016 | New Zealand National Boxing Federation | 1 | |
| Jonathan Taylor | 1 | 12 November 2016 | New Zealand Professional Boxing Association | 0 | Defeated NZNBF Champion, Jordan Tai. |
| Francis Waitai | 1 | 10 October 2020 – Present | Pro Box NZ | 3 | |
| Ricaia Warren | 1 | 15 November 2025 | New Zealand Professional Boxing Association | 0 | |

== See also ==
- List of New Zealand world boxing champions
- List of New Zealand female boxing champions
- List of New Zealand heavyweight boxing champions
- List of New Zealand cruiserweight boxing champions
- List of New Zealand light heavyweight boxing champions
- List of New Zealand middleweight boxing champions
- List of New Zealand super welterweight boxing champions
- List of New Zealand welterweight boxing champions
- List of New Zealand super lightweight boxing champions
- List of New Zealand lightweight boxing champions
- List of New Zealand super featherweight boxing champions
- List of New Zealand featherweight boxing champions
- List of New Zealand bantamweight boxing champions
- Professional boxing in New Zealand
