= List of New Zealand middleweight boxing champions =

This list of New Zealand middleweight boxing champions is a table showing the boxers who have won the New Zealand professional middleweight championship.

The title has been administered by the New Zealand Boxing Association, New Zealand National Boxing Federation, New Zealand Professional Boxing Association and New Zealand Boxing Council since 1884.

The New Zealand middleweight title is the oldest New Zealand boxing title out of all the boxing weight divisions.

A champion will often voluntarily relinquish the title in order to fight for a higher-ranked championship, such as the world. Where the date on which a champion relinquished the title is unclear.

Name	Reign	Duration of reign	Title	Defences	Note
Jim Pettengell	1	17 November 1884 – 21 December 1887	New Zealand Title	6	First to hold a New Zealand title in any Weight Division.
Jack Jones	1	21 December 1887	New Zealand Title	0	Jones was stripped of his title when he returned to Australia.
Sid Barnes	1	6 April 1891 – 1 June 1891	New Zealand Title	1	
Tommy Williams	1	1 June 1891	New Zealand Title	0	
Harry Haley	1	20 April 1907	New Zealand Boxing Association	0	
Jim Griffin	1	8 July 1909	New Zealand Boxing Association	0	
George Gus Devitt	1	27 January 1910	New Zealand Boxing Association	0	Gus Devitt subsequently stripped of title when he moves to Australia
Archie Leckie	1	7 August 1911	New Zealand Boxing Association	0	Title vacated by Archie Leckie
Dennis Denny Murphy	1	30 July 1913 – 11 February 1914	New Zealand Boxing Association	1	
Barney Ireland	1	11 February 1914 – 5 May 1915	New Zealand Boxing Association	1	
Dennis Denny Murphy	2	5 May 1915	New Zealand Boxing Association	0	
Sid Mitchell	1	3 June 1915	New Zealand Boxing Association	1	Sid Mitchell is stripped of title. Mitchell one and only defence was declared a non contest.
Dennis Denny Murphy	3	27 October 1917 – 29 December 1917	New Zealand Boxing Association	1	
Frank Griffin	1	29 December 1917	New Zealand Boxing Association	0	Griffin is stripped of title.
Jack Heeney	1	9 October 1920 – 15 February 1924	New Zealand Boxing Association	3	
Eddie Parker	1	15 February 1924 – 16 October 1924	New Zealand Boxing Association	2	
Lachie McDonald	1	16 October 1924 – 20 June 1927	New Zealand Boxing Association	3	
Harry Casey	1	20 June 1927	New Zealand Boxing Association	4	Casey relinquished the title. Casey last defence was on 4 June 1928
Artie Hay	1	30 September 1929 – 27 September 1930	New Zealand Boxing Association	1	vacated by Artie Hay's retirement
Fred Parker	1	28 September 1931	New Zealand Boxing Association	1	Parker relinquished the title. His one and only defence was on 31 October 1931
George McEwan	1	7 September 1932 – 12 June 1933	New Zealand Boxing Association	1	
Bert Lowe	1	12 June 1933 – 21 October 1933	New Zealand Boxing Association	0	Title vacant after Lowe died.
Harry Lister	1	2 December 1933	New Zealand Boxing Association	0	Lister relinquished the title without defending it
Maurice O'Brien	1	15 July 1937	New Zealand Boxing Association	1	O'Brien retired shortly after winning the title.
George Allen	1	30 June 1938 – 29 September 1938	New Zealand Boxing Association	1	
Cliff Hanham	1	29 September 1938 – 1 November 1938	New Zealand Boxing Association	1	
Stan Jenkin	1	1 November 1938 – 4 March 1940	New Zealand Boxing Association	0	Title vacant after Jenkin died.
Cliff Hanham	2	24 August 1940	New Zealand Boxing Association	2	Hanham retired and relinquished the title. Hanham last defence was on 27 September 1945
Roy Stevens	1	27 May 1946	New Zealand Boxing Association	0	Stevens relinquished the title without defending it.
Jimmy Beal	1	12 May 1952	New Zealand Boxing Association	0	Beal retires shortly after winning the title.
Ross Sadler	1	21 March 1952 – 24 January 1955	New Zealand Boxing Association	2	Sadler retired and relinquished title.
Charley Beaton	1	15 October 1955 – 1 June 1957	New Zealand Boxing Association	2	
Barry Brown	1	1 June 1957	New Zealand Boxing Association	0	Title vacated by Brown.
Tuna Scanlan	1	7 December 1957	New Zealand Boxing Association	3	Scanlan stripped of title on medical grounds. Scanlan last defence was on 17 October 1960.
Earl Nikora	1	3 February 1964	New Zealand Boxing Association	0	Nikora relinquished the title without defending it.
Filo Manuoa	1	28 March 1966 – 25 May 1966	New Zealand Boxing Association	1	
Johnny Henderson	1	25 May 1966 – 17 April 1967	New Zealand Boxing Association	0	Henderson relinquished the title on April 17, 1967 without defending it.
Fred Taupola	1	19 August 1968 – 25 October 1971	New Zealand Boxing Association	2	
Kahu Mahanga	1	25 October 1971 – 2 April 1973	New Zealand Boxing Association	1	
Battling La'avasia	1	2 April 1973	New Zealand Boxing Association	1	La'avasia relinquishes the title. La'avasia one and only defence was on 14 March 1974.
Jeff Rackley	1	3 September 1976	New Zealand Boxing Association	0	
Craig Parsons	1	11 July 1984 – 30 September 1985	New Zealand Boxing Association	2	
Fred Taufua	1	30 September 1985 – 1 August 1986	New Zealand Boxing Association	0	Taufua retires without defending the title.
Piilua Taito	1	28 September 1987	New Zealand Boxing Association	0	Taito relinquished the title without defending it.
Thomas Mika	1	30 June 1992 – 2 February 1993	New Zealand Boxing Association	1	
Marty Sullivan	1	2 February 1993 – 21 July 1995	New Zealand Boxing Association	4	Sullivan retired and relinquished title.
Alan Gibson	1	26 February 1999 – 21 October 2001	New Zealand Boxing Association	1	
Alan Gibson	2	22 April 2000	New Zealand Professional Boxing Association	0	Gibson Held both titles.
Alberto MaChong	1	23 May 2000	New Zealand National Boxing Federation	0	
Sean Sullivan	1	21 October 2001	New Zealand Boxing Association	0	
Gerrard Zohs	1	2 September 2001	New Zealand Professional Boxing Association	1	Last defence was on 27 of October 2001.
Norm Graham	1	7 September 2002	New Zealand Professional Boxing Association	0	
Gregory Apuwai	1	10 September 2005	New Zealand National Boxing Federation	4	
Gunnar Jackson	1	28 June 2013 – 1 July 2016	New Zealand Professional Boxing Association	1	
Ivana Siau	1	25 September 2015 – 29 April 2016	New Zealand National Boxing Federation	1	
Mose Auimatagi Jnr	1	29 April 2016	New Zealand National Boxing Federation	0	
Mose Auimatagi Jnr	2	1 July 2016 – 18 January 2018	New Zealand Professional Boxing Association	0	Auimatagi vacated the title.
Beau O'Brien	1	6 October 2018 – 29 January 2019	New Zealand Professional Boxing Association	0	O'Brien second New Zealand Title. First New Zealand title was in Super Welterweight division. O'Brien vacated his title to focus on Super Welterweight division.
Andrei Mikhailovich	1	3 August 2019	Pro Box NZ	0	
Marcus Heywood	1	20 August 2022	Professional Boxing Commission New Zealand	0	
Nicholas Benn	1	30 November 2024	Pro Box NZ	0	

== See also ==
- List of New Zealand world boxing champions
- List of New Zealand female boxing champions
- List of New Zealand heavyweight boxing champions
- List of New Zealand cruiserweight boxing champions
- List of New Zealand light heavyweight boxing champions
- List of New Zealand super middleweight boxing champions
- List of New Zealand super welterweight boxing champions
- List of New Zealand welterweight boxing champions
- List of New Zealand super lightweight boxing champions
- List of New Zealand lightweight boxing champions
- List of New Zealand super featherweight boxing champions
- List of New Zealand featherweight boxing champions
- List of New Zealand bantamweight boxing champions
- Professional boxing in New Zealand
