= List of New Zealand world boxing champions =

This List of New Zealand world boxing champions is a collection of tables showing the New Zealand boxers who have been recognized to have won either major or minor world boxing titles. New Zealand boxer are defined in this table as people were are either born, ranked, citizen or reside in New Zealand or have Maori lineage. The major titles coming from the WBA, WBO, WBC, IBF or recognized world champions before the major bodies were established. The minor world titles are not universally recognized world champion but have won world titles from minor sanctioning bodies. The minor bodies include but not limited to IBO, WIBA, WBF and more. This list does not include subvariant of titles which may include but not limited to WBA Gold, WBO Global, WBC Diamond and WBC Silver. However, if an interim World champion was achieved, this would be included.

== Men's ==
=== Major ===
==== Heavyweight ====
Name	Reign	Duration of reign	Title	Defences	Note	References
Bob Fitzsimmons	1	21 February 1896 – 2 December 1896	World Heavyweight title	1	Second overall World title reign	
Bob Fitzsimmons	2	17 March 1897 – 9 June 1899	World Heavyweight title	1	Third overall world title reign	
Joseph Parker	1	10 December 2016 – 31 March 2018	WBO World Heavyweight title	3	First New Zealander to win on New Zealand soil. First ever New Zealand born world champion to successfully defend a world title.	
Joseph Parker	-	8 March 2024 – 25 October 2025	Interim WBO World Heavyweight title	2		

==== Light Heavyweight ====
Name	Reign	Duration of reign	Title	Defences	Note	References
Bob Fitzsimmons	1	25 September 1903 – 20 December 1905	World Light Heavyweight title	1	Fourth and last overall world title reign	

==== Middleweight ====
Name	Reign	Duration of reign	Title	Defences	Note	References
Bob Fitzsimmons	1	14 January 1891 – 26 September 1894	World Middleweight title	2	First overall world title reign	
Maselino Masoe	1	1 May 2004 – 11 March 2006	WBA Middleweight Champion	1		

==== Featherweight ====
Name	Reign	Duration of reign	Title	Defences	Note	References
Torpedo Billy Murphy	1	13 January – 2 September 1890	World featherweight champion	1	First every New Zealand world champion	

=== Minor ===
==== Heavyweight ====
Name	Reign	Duration of reign	Title	Defences	Note	References
Jimmy Thunder	1	23 July 1993 – 19 November 1993	World Boxing Federation World Heavyweight title	2		
Jimmy Thunder	2	29 October 1994 – 12 January 1996	International Boxing Organization World Heavyweight title	2		
Kali Meehan	1	24 June 2011 – 7 March 2012	World Boxing Foundation World Heavyweight title	0		

==== Cruiserweight ====
Name	Reign	Duration of reign	Title	Defences	Note	References
Floyd Masson	1	1 April 2023 – 9 September 2023	IBO World Cruiserweight champion	1	Masson is New Zealand born but ranked as an Australian	

==== Light Heavyweight ====
Name	Reign	Duration of reign	Title	Defences	Note	References
Soulan Pownceby	1	17 June 2010 – 1 June 2012	World Boxing Foundation World Light Heavyweight champion	0	Retired with the belt without defending. 14 years after winning the belt, there still has not been anyone to won the belt since.	

==== Welterweight ====
Name	Reign	Duration of reign	Title	Defences	Note	References
Bowyn Morgan	1	18 May 2019 – 16 December 2020	World Boxing Union World Welterweight champion	1		

==== Super Lightweight ====
Name	Reign	Duration of reign	Title	Defences	Note	References
Anthony Taylor	1	22 August 2015 – 7 October 2017	World Boxing Union World Super Lightweight champion	0		

== Women's ==
=== Major ===
==== Heavyweight ====
Name	Reign	Duration of reign	Title	Defences	Note	References
Lani Daniels	1	27 May 2023 – 15 December 2023	IBF World Heavyweight champion	1	First overall reign. First New Zealand boxer to win world title after losing her first world title fight.	Daniels vacated her title for her Light Heavyweright title.

==== Light Heavyweight ====
Name	Reign	Duration of reign	Title	Defences	Note	References
Geovana Peres	1	30 March 2019 – 26 January 2021	WBO World Light Heavyweight champion	1	First ever female New Zealander to win world title on NZ soil. First ever New Zealand LGBT boxer to win a world title. Retired with the belt. New Zealands oldest World champion.	
Lani Daniels	1	2 December 2023 – 6 December 2025	IBF World Light Heavyweight champion	2	Second overall reign. First ever New Zealand born boxer to win world title in multiple weight divisions. First ever New Zealand born boxer to become a multiple world champion.	

==== Super Middleweight ====
Name	Reign	Duration of reign	Title	Defences	Note	References
Lani Daniels	1	17 April 2026 – Present	WBO & IBF World Super Middleweight champion	0	First ever female to win world titles in three weight divisions. First New Zealander to win The Ring Magazine title.	

==== Welterweight ====
Name	Reign	Duration of reign	Title	Defences	Note	References
Daniella Smith	1	12 November 2010 – 11 June 2011	IBF World Welterweight champion	1	First ever female to win IBF world title. First ever New Zealand female to win a world title. First ever Maori to win a world title.	

==== Super Bantamweight ====
Name	Reign	Duration of reign	Title	Defences	Note	References
Cherneka Johnson	1	20 April 2022 – 10 June 2023	IBF World Super Bantamweight champion	2	First ever maori to successfully defend their world title.	

==== Bantamweight ====
Name	Reign	Duration of reign	Title	Defences	Note	References
Cherneka Johnson	1	12 May 2024 – 11 July 2025	WBA World Bantamweight champion	1	Second overall world title	
Cherneka Johnson	-	11 July 2025 – 8 August 2026	Undisputed World Bantamweight champion	2	First ever New Zealand born Undisputed world champion	

=== Minor ===
==== Heavyweight ====
Name	Reign	Duration of reign	Title	Defences	Note	References
Allahna Tuteru	1	8 November 2025 – Present	WIBA World Heavyweight champion	0	First ever Cook Island descent to successfully win a world title.	

==== Super Bantamweight ====
Name	Reign	Duration of reign	Title	Defences	Note	References
Gentiane Lupi	-	9 May 2015 – September 2015	Interim WIBA World Super Bantamweight champion	0		
Gentiane Lupi	1	September 2015 – 16 April 2016	WIBA World Super Bantamweight champion	0	September 2015 the interim title was promoted to full world champion.	
Mea Motu	1	27 April 2023 – 25 January 2025	IBO World Super Bantamweight champion	3		

==== Bantamweight ====
Name	Reign	Duration of reign	Title	Defences	Note	References
Cherneka Johnson	1	17 March 2018 – 23 March 2019	WIBA World Bantamweight champion	0		

==== Light Flyweight ====
Name	Reign	Duration of reign	Title	Defences	Note	References
Emma Nesbitt	1	2 May 2025 – 2 August 2026	WIBA World Light Flyweight champion	0		

== See also ==
- List of New Zealand female boxing champions
- List of New Zealand heavyweight boxing champions
- List of New Zealand cruiserweight boxing champions
- List of New Zealand light heavyweight boxing champions
- List of New Zealand super middleweight boxing champions
- List of New Zealand middleweight boxing champions
- List of New Zealand super welterweight boxing champions
- List of New Zealand welterweight boxing champions
- List of New Zealand super lightweight boxing champions
- List of New Zealand lightweight boxing champions
- List of New Zealand super featherweight boxing champions
- List of New Zealand featherweight boxing champions
- List of New Zealand bantamweight boxing champions
- Professional boxing in New Zealand
- Boxing and Wrestling Act 1981
