= List of New Zealand female boxing champions =

This list of New Zealand female boxing champions is a table showing the female boxers who have won the New Zealand professional championship. The title has been administered by the New Zealand Boxing Association, New Zealand National Boxing Federation, Professional Boxing Commission New Zealand and New Zealand Professional Boxing Association since 2002. A champion will often voluntarily relinquish the title in order to fight for a higher-ranked championship, such as the world. Where the date on which a champion relinquished the title is unclear.

== History ==
In 2002, Sue Glassey became the first female to win a professional New Zealand national boxing title, winning against Wena Karaka. In 2008, Daniella Smith became the first female to win multiple professional New Zealand national boxing titles, winning her second title against Lisa Mauala. Daniella Smith is also the first female boxer to win a professional New Zealand national boxing title in multiple divisions, winning the title in both Super Welterweight and Welterweight division. In 2017, Geovana Peres became the first lgbt boxer to win a professional New Zealand national boxing title. Geovana is also the first ever boxer to win two professional New Zealand national boxing titles from different commissioning bodies including the New Zealand National Boxing Federation and Professional Boxing Commission New Zealand national titles. In 2018, Lani Daniels became the first female boxer to win two New Zealand national titles from two different weight divisions and two different commissioning bodies. On 12th of February, Mea Motu beat the 14 year record that was set by Daniella Smith for holding most New Zealand National titles in the women's division. She held the NZPBA Lightweight, PBCNZ Super Lightweight and PBCNZ Featherweight title. Motu went on to win titles in four different weight divisions.

== Heavyweight ==
Name	Beginning of Reign	Title	Opponent	Defences
Alrie Meleisea	10 March 2017	New Zealand Professional Boxing Association	Nailini Helu	1
Sarah Long	13 October 2018	New Zealand Professional Boxing Association	Ashley Campbell	0
Alrie Meleisea	9 December 2022	Pro Box NZ	Sequita Hemingway	0
Sequita Hemingway	19 August 2023	Pro Box NZ	Maria Hunt	1
Sequita Hemingway	7 September 2024	New Zealand National Boxing Federation	Cheyenne Whaanga	0

== Crusierweight ==
Name	Beginning of Reign	Title	Opponent	Defences
Tinta Smith	11 May 2024	New Zealand Professional Boxing Commission	Sequita Hemingway	0

== Light Heavyweight ==
Name	Beginning of Reign	Title	Opponent	Defences
Geovana Peres	21 April 2017	New Zealand National Boxing Federation	Nailini Helu	0
Geovana Peres	13 October 2017	New Zealand Professional Boxing Commission	Trish Vaka	1
Lani Daniels	18 November 2017	New Zealand Professional Boxing Association	Trish Vaka	1
Lani Daniels	24 June 2022	Pro Box NZ	Tinta Smith	0
Stacey Loye	12 September 2026	Professional Boxing Commission New Zealand	Tinta Smith	0

== Super Middleweight ==
Name	Beginning of Reign	Title	Opponent
Lani Daniels	22 September 2018	Pro Box NZ	Tessa Tualevao
Tema Taukau	20 November 2026	New Zealand Professional Boxing Association	Mia Brake

== Super Welterweight ==
Name	Beginning of Reign	Title	Opponent
Daniella Smith	6 May 2006	New Zealand Professional Boxing Association	Sue Glassey

== Welterweight ==
Name	Beginning of Reign	Title	Opponent
Sue Glassey	9 August 2002	New Zealand Boxing Association	Wena Karaka
Daniella Smith	13 December 2008	New Zealand Professional Boxing Association	Lisa Mauala
Michaela Jenkins	15 December 2018	Pro Box New Zealand	Megyn McLennan
Macca Jean	7 October 2023	Pro Box New Zealand	Tania Barnett

== Super Lightweight ==
Name	Beginning of Reign	Title	Opponent
Baby Nansen	1 September 2017	New Zealand Professional Boxing Commission	Quinita Hati
Karen Te Ruki Pasene	29 February 2020	New Zealand Professional Boxing Commission	Tania Reid
Mea Motu	3 July 2021	New Zealand Professional Boxing Commission	Michaela Jenkins

== Lightweight ==
Name	Beginning of Reign	Title	Opponent
Gentiane Lupi	13 December 2014	New Zealand Professional Boxing Association	Daniella Smith
Quinita Hati	19 May 2018	New Zealand Professional Boxing Commission	Tania Reid
Mea Motu	26 March 2021	New Zealand Professional Boxing Association	Tania Reid
Tricia MacKenzie	5 July 2025	Pro Box NZ	Jadene Treadaway
Jadene Treadaway	21 March 2026	Pro Box NZ	Macy Smith

== Super Featherweight ==
Name	Beginning of Reign	Title	Opponent	Defences
Rebecca Jennings	10 September 2016	New Zealand Professional Boxing Association	Daria Smith	1
Mea Motu	30 April 2022	New Zealand Professional Boxing Commission	Baby Nansen	0

== Featherweight ==
Name	Beginning of Reign	Title	Opponent	Defences
Mea Motu	12 February 2022	New Zealand Professional Boxing Commission	Ayisha Abied	0

== Bantamweight ==
Name	Beginning of Reign	Title	Opponent
Christine Gillespie	2 November 2024	New Zealand Professional Boxing Association	Sarah Linton

== Super Flyweight ==
Name	Beginning of Reign	Title	Opponent
Michelle Preston	5 November 2010	New Zealand National Boxing Federation	Shona Batty

== See also ==
- List of New Zealand world boxing champions
- List of Australian female boxing champions
- List of New Zealand heavyweight boxing champions
- List of New Zealand cruiserweight boxing champions
- List of New Zealand light heavyweight boxing champions
- List of New Zealand super middleweight boxing champions
- List of New Zealand middleweight boxing champions
- List of New Zealand super welterweight boxing champions
- List of New Zealand welterweight boxing champions
- List of New Zealand super lightweight boxing champions
- List of New Zealand lightweight boxing champions
- List of New Zealand super featherweight boxing champions
- List of New Zealand featherweight boxing champions
- List of New Zealand bantamweight boxing champions
- Professional boxing in New Zealand
