= List of New Zealand heavyweight boxing champions =

This list of New Zealand heavyweight boxing champions is a table showing the boxers who have won the New Zealand professional heavyweight championship. The title has been administered by the New Zealand Boxing Association, New Zealand National Boxing Federation, Pro Box NZ, New Zealand Professional Boxing Commission and New Zealand Professional Boxing Association since 1885. A champion will often voluntarily relinquish the title in order to fight for a higher-ranked championship, such as a world title.

| Name | Reign | Duration of reign | Title | Defences | Note |
|---|---|---|---|---|---|
| Dick Matthews | 1 | 16 March 1885 – 6 January 1888 | New Zealand Title | 5 | |
| Harry Laing | 1 | 9 August 1886 – 25 April 1888 | New Zealand Title | 7 | Laing fought Matthews in January 1888 to unify the New Zealand titles. |
| Frank Slavin | 1 | 25 April 1888 | New Zealand Title | 0 | Last New Zealand Champion from the 1800s |
| Jim Maloney | 1 | 30 June 1909 | New Zealand Boxing Association Title | 0 | First NZBA Champion. Vacated title to fight in Australia. |
| Jim Mitchell | 1 | 13 August 1910 – 9 September 1910 | New Zealand Boxing Association Title | 1 | |
| Bill Yank Rudd | 1 | 9 September 1910 – 26 January 1911 | New Zealand Boxing Association Title | 2 | |
| Jack Blackmore | 1 | 26 January 1911 | New Zealand Boxing Association Title | 0 | Title was stripped when he returned to Australia |
| Jim Mitchell | 2 | 10 November 1911 – 22 November 1911 | New Zealand Boxing Association Title | 1 | |
| Charlie Herbert | 1 | 22 November 1911 | New Zealand Boxing Association Title | 0 | Voluntarily vacated the title |
| Jim Mitchell | 3 | 8 April 1912 – 5 October 1912 | New Zealand Boxing Association Title | 2 | |
| Bert Lowe | 1 | 5 October 1912 – 8 November 1912 | New Zealand Boxing Association Title | 1 | |
| Barney Ireland | 1 | 8 November 1912 – 27 November 1912 | New Zealand Boxing Association Title | 1 | |
| Bert Lowe | 2 | 27 November 1912 – 12 February 1913 | New Zealand Boxing Association Title | 1 | |
| Fred Williams | 1 | 12 February 1913 – 23 October 1913 | New Zealand Boxing Association Title | 1 | |
| Bert Lowe | 3 | 23 October 1913 – 28 October 1914 | New Zealand Boxing Association Title | 2 | |
| Albert Pooley | 1 | 28 October 1914 – 12 December 1919 | New Zealand Boxing Association Title | 3 | |
| Jimmy Clabby | 1 | 12 December 1919 | New Zealand Boxing Association Title | 0 | Voluntarily vacated the title |
| Albert Pooley | 2 | Unknown | New Zealand Boxing Association Title | 1 | New Zealand Boxing Association awarded Pooley the title, even though he did not beat anyone for the title. |
| Tom Heeney | 1 | 27 October 1920 – 15 April 1922 | New Zealand Boxing Association Title | 1 | Voluntarily vacated the title |
| Brian McCleary | 1 | 15 April 1922 – 14 August 1923 | New Zealand Boxing Association Title | 3 | McCleary won vacated title. |
| Tom Heeney | 2 | 14 August 1923 – 26 September 1923 | New Zealand Boxing Association Title | 1 | |
| Jim O'Sullivan | 1 | 26 September 1923 – 10 November 1923 | New Zealand Boxing Association Title | 1 | |
| Tom Heeney | 3 | 10 November 1923 | New Zealand Boxing Association Title | 2 | Voluntarily vacated the title |
| George Modrich | 1 | | New Zealand Boxing Association Title | 1 | New Zealand Boxing Association awarded Modrich the title, even though he did not beat anyone for the title. |
| Eddie Parker | 1 | 12 February 1925 | New Zealand Boxing Association Title | 0 | Voluntarily vacated the title. |
| Alan Campbell | 1 | 28 April 1930 – 1 May 1933 | New Zealand Boxing Association Title | 4 | |
| Ray Nicol | 1 | 1 May 1933 | New Zealand Boxing Association Title | 2 | Voluntarily vacated the title |
| Maurice Strickland | 1 | 20 June 1934 – 18 July 1934 | New Zealand Boxing Association Title | 1 | |
| Ray Nicol | 2 | 18 July 1934 – 15 April 1935 | New Zealand Boxing Association Title | 2 | |
| Maurice Strickland | 2 | 15 April 1935 | New Zealand Boxing Association Title | 0 | Voluntarily vacated the title |
| Ray Nicol | 3 | 18 November 1935 | New Zealand Boxing Association Title | 0 | |
| Don Mullett | 1 | 26 December 1942 – 18 February 1952 | New Zealand Boxing Association Title | 7 | |
| Chub Keith | 1 | 18 February 1952 | New Zealand Boxing Association Title | 1 | Voluntarily vacated the title |
| Don Mullett | 2 | 15 September 1952 – 25 September 1954 | New Zealand Boxing Association Title | 1 | |
| Chub Keith | 2 | 25 September 1954 | New Zealand Boxing Association Title | 0 | Voluntarily vacated the title |
| Roy Stevens | 1 | 22 June 1957 – 16 August 1958 | New Zealand Boxing Association Title | 2 | |
| Sonny Pehi | 1 | 16 August 1958 | New Zealand Boxing Association Title | 2 | Voluntarily vacated the title |
| George Mahoni | 2 | 5 September 1960 – 10 October 1963 | New Zealand Boxing Association Title | 0 | Voluntarily vacated the title |
| Fonomanu Young Sekona | 1 | 10 March 1982 | New Zealand Professional Boxing Association | 0 | |
| George Stankovich | 1 | 30 March 1983 | New Zealand Boxing Association Title | 0 | |
| August Tanuvasa | 1 | 28 September 1987 – 10 February 1988 | New Zealand Boxing Association Title | 1 | |
| Lance Revill | 1 | 10 February 1988 | New Zealand Boxing Association Title | 0 | |
| Young Haumona | 1 | 11 October 1990 | New Zealand Boxing Association Title | 3 | |
| Toakipa Tasefa | 1 | 19 February 1998 | New Zealand Boxing Association Title | 0 | |
| Shane Cameron | 1 | 4 December 2004 | New Zealand Professional Boxing Association | 1 | |
| Amosa Zinck | 1 | 17 September 2005 | New Zealand National Boxing Federation | 0 | |
| Daniel Tai | 1 | 5 June 2006 – 16 August 2008 | New Zealand National Boxing Federation | 2 | |
| Chauncy Welliver | 1 | 16 August 2008 | New Zealand National Boxing Federation | 4 | |
| Sonny Bill Williams | 1 | 8 February 2012 | New Zealand Professional Boxing Association | 0 | |
| Afa Tatupu | 1 | 19 April 2013 – 10 October 2013 | New Zealand National Boxing Federation | 1 | |
| Joseph Parker | 1 | 10 October 2013 | New Zealand National Boxing Federation | 0 | |
| Hemi Ahio | 1 | 3 November 2015 | New Zealand National Boxing Federation | 0 | |
| Junior Fa | 1 | 18 March 2017 | New Zealand Professional Boxing Association | 0 | |
| Hemi Ahio | 2 | 1 September 2017 | New Zealand Professional Boxing Commission | 0 | |
| James Langton | 1 | 9 December 2017 | Pro Box NZ | 0 | |
| Daniel Tai | 2 | 29 March 2018 | New Zealand National Boxing Federation | 0 | |
| Kiki Toa Leutele | 1 | 12 May 2023 | Pro Box NZ | 0 | |
| Richard Tutaki | 1 | 28 October 2023 | New Zealand Professional Boxing Commission | 0 | Passed away while being champion in December 2024 |

== See also ==
- List of New Zealand world boxing champions
- List of New Zealand female boxing champions
- List of New Zealand cruiserweight boxing champions
- List of New Zealand light heavyweight boxing champions
- List of New Zealand super middleweight boxing champions
- List of New Zealand middleweight boxing champions
- List of New Zealand super welterweight boxing champions
- List of New Zealand welterweight boxing champions
- List of New Zealand super lightweight boxing champions
- List of New Zealand lightweight boxing champions
- List of New Zealand super featherweight boxing champions
- List of New Zealand featherweight boxing champions
- List of New Zealand bantamweight boxing champions
- Professional boxing in New Zealand
