= Andrei Mikhailovich =

Russian boxer (born 1997)

Personal information
- Nickname: Renegade
- Nationality: Russian New Zealander
- Born: Andrei Mikhailovich Driessen; 15 December 1997 (age 28) Saint Petersburg, Russia
- Height: 1.82 m (6 ft 0 in)
- Weight: Light middleweight Middleweight; Super middleweight

Boxing career
- Reach: 189 cm (74 in)
- Stance: Orthodox

Boxing record
- Total fights: 23
- Wins: 21
- Win by KO: 13
- Losses: 2

Andrei Mikhailovich Driessen (Russian: Андрей Михайлович Дриссен), known by his patronymic Mikhailovich (Russian: Михайлович; born 15 December 1997), is a Russian-born, New Zealand raised professional boxer. He has won multiple New Zealand national championships in two weight classes (light middleweight and middleweight). At regional level, Mikhailovich has also won the IBF Pan-Pacific and WBO Global middleweight belts. In 2025, Mikhailovich would become a world title challenger when he fought for the IBF World middleweight title in October 2024 against Janibek Alimkhanuly.

== Early life ==
Mikhailovich and his twin brother were born in Russia. They were adopted from an orphanage in 1999 when they were 18 months old.

== Amateur career ==
Mikhailovich's amateur career has been described as decent. During his amateur career he competed in multiple New Zealand National championships and has won the North Island Golden Gloves Championships. It was at an amateur boxing event where he met his current coach and manager Isaac Peach at Peach Boxing.

== Professional career ==
=== Professional Debut, Gunnar Jackson Rivalry, New Zealand Champion 2018 - 2020 ===
In April 2018, Mikhailovich made his professional boxing debut against Rob Ramsey. In the first 12 months of his professional boxing career, he defeated many credible opponents including Jerome Pascua, former WBA PABA and New Zealand Champion Adrian Taihia and former IBO Oceania Champion Chase Haley. During this time Mikhailovich fought multiple journeymen as well including Simon Julian and former New Zealand champion Daniel Maxwell.

In August 2019, Mikhailovich fought against his first major rival, former top 10 in the WBO Gunnar Jackson. The fight against Jackson was considered a grudge match as Mikhailovich had called out Jackson earlier in the year. Adding to that, Mikhailovich's coach Isaac Peach had beaten Jackson in the past as a professional boxer. Mikhailovich won the fight by unanimous decision, winning almost every one of the 10 rounds and securing his first professional boxing belt, the New Zealand National (Pro Box NZ version) Middleweight title. After the fight, Jackson announced his retirement from professional boxing.

In November 2020, Mikhailovich fought and defeated Marcus Heywood by unanimous decision for his second New Zealand title, the PBCNZ version in the Super Welterweight division. In April 2021, he defended the title successfully against former New Zealand champion Shay Brock, winning the fight by TKO.

=== Alex Hanan rivalry, regional titles 2021 - 2022 ===
In June 2021, Mikhailovich fought Alex Hanan (now known as Alex Walters) in a grudge match. The rivalry started in July 2018 with Alex making comments about Andrei Mikhailovich in an interview with New Zealand YouTube Boxing Channel Gladrap. Mikhailovich responded with his own comments in December 2018 in an interview with Gladrap, saying: "I want to fight you, I always wanted to fight you, and when I do I will back you up and probably knock you out". Mikhailovich had a war of words with Alex at the press conference for their fight in May 2021 with Mikhailovich responding "Call me daddy... I’ll f*** you up". Right before the fight directly after the referee gave his last words before the fight, Alex landed a cheap gut shot to Mikhailovich. Mikhailovich nevertheless won the fight by TKO in the second round. Everything to do with the fight from the press conference, to the gut punch pre-fight, to the stoppage itself went viral on the internet, reaching millions of viewers.

In 2022, it was confirmed that Mikhailovich and his stablemate from Peach Boxing Jerome Pampellone signed a long term promoter agreement with Dean Lonergan. In April 2022, Mikhailovich took on 2002 Commonwealth Games light welterweight bronze medallist and Olympian King Davidson. It didn't take Mikhailovich long as he knocked out Davidson in one minute. In June 2022, Mikhailovich took on Venezuelan Ernesto Espana. Mikhailovich won the fight by third round stoppage winning his first regional titles including the IBF Pan Pacific middleweight title and WBO Global middleweight title. In June 2022, Mikhailovich made his debut in the world rankings in the Middleweight division with him reaching 13th in the IBF and 12th in the WBO. In July 2022, Mikhailovich took on New Zealander Francis Waitai. Despite winning the fight by unanimous decision, Mikhailovich was disappointed in his performance. In November 2022, it was announced that Mikhailovich would take on his current biggest rival Issac Hardman. Unfortunately 18 days after the announcement, the fight was postponed to 2023 due to Hardman partner giving birth to their child. Promoter Dean Lonergan said "Issac had a baby about three or four days ago. I got a phone call from his trainer saying 'look, Issac's not great at saying no. I don't think he can handle having a baby and fighting sort of three weeks apart'". Since his last fight, his ranking had improved to 10th in the IBF and 12th in the WBO.

=== World title shot 2023 - 2024 ===
On 27 April 2023, Mikhailovich took on undefeated Venezuelian Edisson Saltarin. Mikhailovich got knocked down in the first round but overcame and stopped Saltarin in the fifth. In June 2023, it was announced that Mikhailovich would take on Denis Radovan for the top two mandatory positions with the IBF, with the winner guaranteed a World title shot. It was revealed that negotiations hit a brick wall where there were disputes over who should have the TV Rights for the fight with the promoter opting for DAZN and Dean Lonergan wanting Sky Arena for New Zealand. The fight has been confirmed for 16 December in the UK. In February 2024, Mikhailovich and Peach Boxing announced their departure with Dean Lonergan D&L Events and had signed with No Limit Boxing under Matt and George Rose. Mikhailovich made his in ring boxing return when he against Australian journeyman Les Sherrington in April where Mikhailovich won by first round stoppage. Mikhailovich would be scheduled to fight for the IBF and WBO World Middleweight title in July 2024 against Janibek Alimkhanuly, however, the fight was called off last minute due to Alimkhanuly suffering from severe dehydration. The fight would be postponed to October where only the IBF title was on the line, however, Mikhailovich would lose by ninth round stoppage.

=== Post Peach Boxing (2025 - Present) ===
In his last fight under Peach Boxing, he took on Australian Blake Wells, which Mikhailovich lost by split decision, which was considered a major upset. In 2025, Mikhailovich left Peach Boxing gym, however, is still listed on No Limit Boxing website as one of their fighters. In December 2025, it was announced that Mikhailovich had signed with Australian promoter Mick Francis under Tasman Fighters and will move up to November super-middleweight division.

== Exhibition career ==
In November 2019, Mikhailovich fought in China against their National Champion. The opponent was 10 kgs heavier than Mikhailovich.

== Boxing titles ==
=== Amateur ===
- 2016 Golden Gloves North Island Championship (Gold)

=== Professional ===
- Pro Box NZ
  - New Zealand National Middleweight Title
- New Zealand Professional Boxing Commission
  - New Zealand National Super Welterweight Title
- International Boxing Federation
  - IBF Pan Pacific Middleweight Title
- World Boxing Organisation
  - WBO Global Middleweight Title

== Professional boxing record ==
23 fights	21 wins	2 losses
By knockout	13	1
By decision	8	1

No.	Result	Record	Opponent	Type	Round, time	Date	Location	Notes
23	Loss	21–2	Blake Wells	SD	6	6 Apr 2025	Newcastle Entertainment Centre, NSW, Australia	
22	Loss	21–1	Janibek Alimkhanuly	KO	9 (12), 2:45	4 Oct 2024	The Star, Pyrmont, Australia	For IBF World middleweight title
21	Win	21–0	Les Sherrington	TKO	1 (10), 1:24	24 Apr 2024	Hordern Pavilion, Sydney, Australia	
20	Win	20–0	Edisson Saltarin	TKO	5 (10), 2:20	27 Apr 2023	Eventfinda Stadium, Auckland, New Zealand	Retained IBF Pan-Pacific and WBO Global middleweight titles
19	Win	19–0	Francis Waitai	UD	8	21 Jul 2022	Eventfinda Stadium, Auckland, New Zealand	
18	Win	18–0	Ernesto España	TKO	3 (10), 1:09	15 Jun 2022	Nissan Arena, Brisbane, Australia	Won vacant IBF Pan-Pacific and WBO Global middleweight titles
17	Win	17–0	King Davidson	TKO	2 (8), 1:14	13 Apr 2022	Fortitude Music Hall, Brisbane, Australia	
16	Win	16–0	Alex Walters	TKO	2 (8), 2:29	16 Jun 2021	International Convention Centre, Sydney, Australia	
15	Win	15–0	Shay Brock	TKO	9 (10), 1:02	9 Apr 2021	SkyCity Theatre, Auckland, New Zealand	Retained PBCNZ light middleweight title
14	Win	14–0	Dylan Wright	TKO	3 (4), 2:01	19 Dec 2020	ABA Stadium, Auckland New Zealand	
13	Win	13–0	Marcus Heywood	UD	8	13 Nov 2020	SkyCity Theatre, Auckland, New Zealand	Won inaugural PBCNZ light middleweight title
12	Win	12–0	Dylan Wright	UD	6	11 Jul 2020	ABA Stadium, Auckland, New Zealand	
11	Win	11–0	Nicholas Taylor	TKO	2 (6)	31 Aug 2019	ABA Stadium, Auckland, New Zealand	
10	Win	10–0	Gunnar Jackson	UD	10	3 Aug 2019	Sir Don Rowlands Centre, Cambridge, New Zealand	Won inaugural Pro-Box NZ middleweight title
9	Win	9–0	Chase Haley	UD	6	18 May 2019	ABA Stadium, Auckland, New Zealand	
8	Win	8–0	Omah Ismail	TKO	4 (4), 2:50	29 Mar 2019	ABA Stadium, Auckland, New Zealand	
7	Win	7–0	Adrian Taihia	UD	6	15 Dec 2018	Horncastle Arena, Christchurch, New Zealand	
6	Win	6–0	James Uoka	TKO	1 (4), 2:40	2 Nov 2018	ABA Stadium, Auckland, New Zealand	
5	Win	5–0	Jessie Nikora	KO	3 (4), 1:02	29 Sep 2018	ABA Stadium, Auckland, New Zealand	
4	Win	4–0	Simon Julian	UD	6	25 Aug 2018	ABA Stadium, Auckland, New Zealand	
3	Win	3–0	Daniel Maxwell	TKO	2 (4), 1:48	14 Jul 2018	AMI Netball Centre, Auckland, New Zealand	
2	Win	2–0	Jerome Pascua	UD	6	30 Jun 2018	Chao Shan General Association, Auckland, New Zealand	
1	Win	1–0	Rob Ramsey	RTD	2 (4), 3:00	21 Apr 2018	ABA Stadium, Auckland, New Zealand	

== Awards ==
- 2019 New Zealand Boxing Awards Boxer of the Year (Nominated)
- 2019 New Zealand Boxing Awards Male Boxer of the Year (Nominated)
- 2019 New Zealand Boxing Awards New Zealand Fight of the year (Nominated)
- 2019 New Zealand Boxing Awards Knockout of the year (Won)
- 2019 New Zealand Boxing Awards Champion of the year (Nominated)
- 2019 New Zealand Boxing Awards Most Entertaining boxer of the Year (Won)
- 2020 New Zealand Boxing Awards Most Entertaining boxer of the Year (Won)
- 2021 New Zealand Boxing Awards Most Entertaining boxer of the Year (Won)
- 2021 New Zealand Boxing Awards New Zealand Fight of the year (Won)
- 2021 New Zealand Boxing Awards Knockout of the year (Won)

== Personal life ==
Mikhailovich is married and is a father of two boys
