= Barney Clarke =

New Zealand boxer

Barney Owen Angus Clarke (6 April 1927 – 8 March 1999) was a champion New Zealand light heavyweight boxer.

== Early life ==
Clarke was born in Auckland and was educated at St Peter's College, where he was a foundation pupil and where the sport of boxing was encouraged by the Christian Brothers so that the boys could defend themselves against bullying. The school boxing championships were held annually, usually at the Municipal Hall, Newmarket.

== Boxing career ==
Clarke was New Zealand Amateur Light heavyweight champion in 1947 and 1948. On 23 May 1949, he became New Zealand Professional Light heavyweight Champion when he defeated Tommy Downes, on points, in 15 rounds, at the Dunedin Town Hall, before a crowd of 2000. Clarke held the title - successfully defending it twice, against Downes and Ray Stevens, until 18 August 1949 when he was defeated by Ray Stevens at Wanganui, also on points in 15 rounds. In his professional career, Clarke fought thirteen bouts, winning 6 (including one knockout) and losing six (one knockout), with one bout drawn. Clarke's last professional bout was on 1 March 1952 at the Mangakino Domain, Mangakino. During his career, Clarke's height was 6 feet 2 inches (188 cm) and he generally weighed about 73 kg (about 11.50 stone).

== Death ==
Clarke died on 8 March 1999, and his ashes were buried at North Shore Memorial Park, Albany.
