= List of New Zealand welterweight boxing champions =

This list of New Zealand welterweight boxing champions is a table showing the boxers who have won the New Zealand professional welterweight championship.

The title has been administered by the New Zealand Boxing Association, New Zealand National Boxing Federation, New Zealand Professional Boxing Association and New Zealand Boxing Council since 1910.

A champion will often voluntarily relinquish the title in order to fight for a higher-ranked championship, such as the world. Where the date on which a champion relinquished the title is unclear.

| Name | Reign | Duration of reign | Title | Defences | Note |
|---|---|---|---|---|---|
| Tim Tracey | 1 | 16 November 1910 – 3 May 1911 | New Zealand Boxing Association | 1 | |
| Dennis Denny Murphy | 1 | 3 May 1911 – 24 May 1911 | New Zealand Boxing Association | 0 | Murphy is DQ'd in a fight against Doss Burns May 24, 1911 and Tracey is named Champion again. |
| Tim Tracey | 2 | 24 May 1911 | New Zealand Boxing Association | 0 | Title vacated by Tracy |
| Dennis Denny Murphy | 2 | 20 December 1911 – 4 October 1912 | New Zealand Boxing Association | 2 | |
| Lyn Truscott | 1 | 4 October 1912 – 28 October 1912 | New Zealand Boxing Association | 1 | |
| Dennis Denny Murphy | 3 | 28 October 1912 – 29 November 1912 | New Zealand Boxing Association | 1 | |
| Lyn Truscott | 2 | 29 November 1912 | New Zealand Boxing Association | 0 | Truscott relinquished title without defending it |
| Dennis Denny Murphy | 4 | 1913 – 24 June 1914 | New Zealand Boxing Association | 3 | Murphy named Champion by the NZBA after Lyn Truscott relinquished title |
| Sid Mitchell | 1 | 24 June 1914 | New Zealand Boxing Association | 0 | |
| Dennis Denny Murphy | 5 | 3 January 1921 – 19 March 1921 | New Zealand Boxing Association | 0 | Title vacated by Dennis Murphy's retirement. |
| Jock Graham | 1 | 28 December 1921 – 11 December 1923 | New Zealand Boxing Association | 2 | |
| Harry May | 1 | 11 December 1923 – 15 September 1924 | New Zealand Boxing Association | 1 | |
| Clarrie Blackburn | 1 | 15 September 1924 – 30 March 1926 | New Zealand Boxing Association | 1 | |
| Dick Loveridge | 1 | 30 March 1926 – 5 May 1926 | New Zealand Boxing Association | 1 | |
| Artie Hay | 1 | 5 May 1926 – 27 September 1930 | New Zealand Boxing Association | 4 | Title vacated by Artie Hay's retirement |
| Ted Morgan | 1 | 20 August 1931 – 9 October 1934 | New Zealand Boxing Association | 2 | |
| Don Stirling | 1 | 9 October 1934 – 26 June 1935 | New Zealand Boxing Association | 3 | |
| Neville Mudgway | 1 | 26 June 1935 – 30 September 1935 | New Zealand Boxing Association | 1 | |
| Don Stirling | 2 | 30 September 1935 – 18 October 1937 | New Zealand Boxing Association | 3 | |
| Stan Jenkin | 1 | 18 October 1937 – 28 April 1938 | New Zealand Boxing Association | 3 | Mudgway named Champion after Jenkin fails to make weight. |
| Neville Mudgway | 2 | 28 April 1938 – 17 August 1939 | New Zealand Boxing Association | 1 | Title vacated by Neville Mudgway's retirement |
| Vic Caltaux | 1 | 4 March 1940 – 23 March 1946 | New Zealand Boxing Association | 4 | |
| Bos Murphy | 1 | 23 March 1946 – 21 July 1946 | New Zealand Boxing Association | 0 | Murphy stripped of title July 21, 1946 |
| Ian Cruickshank | 1 | 3 March 1947 – 26 February 1949 | New Zealand Boxing Association | 1 | |
| Clarrie Gordon | 1 | 26 February 1949 – 12 September 1951 | New Zealand Boxing Association | 0 | Gordon retired September 12, 1951, vacating title |
| Noel Fitzwater | 1 | 29 September 1951 – 21 February 1953 | New Zealand Boxing Association | 3 | Fitzwater relinquished title February 21, 1953 |
| Barry Brown | 1 | 19 March 1953 | New Zealand Boxing Association | 0 | Brown relinquished title |
| Billy Beazley | 1 | 16 August 1954 | New Zealand Boxing Association | 0 | Beazley relinquished title without defending it |
| Barney Shaw | 1 | 18 September 1956 | New Zealand Boxing Association | 0 | Title vacated by Billy Beazley |
| Barry Brown | 2 | 7 October 1957 – 15 April 1958 | New Zealand Boxing Association | 1 | Brown retires, relinquishing the title |
| Peter Graham | 1 | 1 October 1958 – 21 October 1958 | New Zealand Boxing Association | 0 | Graham retires, relinquishing the title |
| Heine Forsyth | 1 | 24 August 1959 – 19 August 1960 | New Zealand Boxing Association | 2 | |
| Joe McNally | 1 | 19 August 1960 – 12 September 1960 | New Zealand Boxing Association | 0 | McNally retires, relinquishing the title |
| Jimmy Williams | 1 | 15 July 1961 – 16 April 1962 | New Zealand Boxing Association | 1 | |
| Heine Forsyth | 2 | 16 April 1962 – 6 December 1962 | New Zealand Boxing Association | 1 | |
| Johnny Lawrence | 1 | 6 December 1962 – 16 November 1963 | New Zealand Boxing Association | 1 | |
| Sam Leuii | 1 | 16 November 1963 – 30 May 1964 | New Zealand Boxing Association | 1 | |
| Dennis Hagen | 1 | 30 May 1964 | New Zealand Boxing Association | 0 | Hagen subsequently stripped of title |
| Graham Smith | 1 | 1965 – 1970 | New Zealand Boxing Association | 1 | Smith named Champion after Dennis Hagen is stripped of title |
| Bill Fatu | 1 | 20 April 1972 – 10 January 1980 | New Zealand Boxing Association | 0 | Fatu retired without defending the title |
| Musa Sione | 1 | 1 December 1982 – 20 December 1983 | New Zealand Boxing Association | 2 | |
| David Stowers | 1 | 20 December 1983 – 7 June 1985 | New Zealand Boxing Association | 0 | Stowers retired and relinquished his national titles |
| Michael Sykes | 1 | 7 March 1989 | New Zealand Boxing Association | 0 | Sykes retired shortly after winning the title. |
| Monty Bhana | 1 | 24 January 1991 – 30 June 1992 | New Zealand Boxing Association | 1 | |
| Alberto MaChong | 1 | 30 June 1992 | New Zealand Boxing Association | 0 | Machong relinquished title without defending it. |
| Sean Sullivan | 1 | 31 May 1994 | New Zealand Boxing Association | | Sullivan last title defence was on 6 November 1999 |
| Cairo George | 1 | 20 April 2013 | New Zealand National Boxing Federation | 1 | |
| Anthony Taylor | 1 | 11 October 2014 – 21 April 2017 | New Zealand Professional Boxing Association | 0 | Taylor announced his retirement. |
| Bowyn Morgan | 1 | 5 March 2016 – 2021 | New Zealand National Boxing Federation | 0 | |
| Sonny Morini | 1 | 14 November 2025 – Present | New Zealand Professional Boxing Commission | 0 | |

== See also ==
- List of New Zealand world boxing champions
- List of New Zealand female boxing champions
- List of New Zealand heavyweight boxing champions
- List of New Zealand cruiserweight boxing champions
- List of New Zealand light heavyweight boxing champions
- List of New Zealand super middleweight boxing champions
- List of New Zealand middleweight boxing champions
- List of New Zealand super welterweight boxing champions
- List of New Zealand super lightweight boxing champions
- List of New Zealand lightweight boxing champions
- List of New Zealand super featherweight boxing champions
- List of New Zealand featherweight boxing champions
- List of New Zealand bantamweight boxing champions
- Professional boxing in New Zealand
