= List of New Zealand lightweight boxing champions =

This list of New Zealand lightweight boxing champions is a table showing the boxers who have won the New Zealand professional lightweight championship.

The title has been administered by the New Zealand Boxing Association and New Zealand Professional Boxing Association since 1885.

A champion will often voluntarily relinquish the title in order to fight for a higher-ranked championship, such as the world. Where the date on which a champion relinquished the title is unclear.

Name	Reign	Duration of reign	Title	Defences	Note
Barney Donovan	1	22 August 1885	New Zealand Title	2	Donovan last defence on 5 December 1885
Torpedo Billy Murphy	1	26 July 1887 – 24 November 1887	New Zealand Title	2	
Ike Fake	1	24 November 1887	New Zealand Title	0	Fake never defended his title.
Torpedo Billy Murphy	2	23 June 1888 – 2 February 1889	New Zealand Title	3	
Tommy Williams	1	2 February 1889	New Zealand Title	2	Williams last defence on 1 January 1890
Thomas Neagle	1	5 June 1891	New Zealand Title	0	Neagle never defended his title.
Jack Nicholson	1	25 May 1892 – 12 April 1893	New Zealand Title	1	
Richard Campbell	1	12 April 1893	New Zealand Title	0	Campbell died of injuries sustained in the bout where he won this title.
Hock Keys	1	20 September 1905	New Zealand Boxing Association	0	Keys relinquished title when he returned to Australia later in 1905.
Jimmy Ross	1	10 August 1906	New Zealand Boxing Association	0	
Bob Turner	1	29 November 1906	New Zealand Boxing Association	0	Turner relinquished the title when he returned to Australia later in 1906.
Tim Tracey	1	10 May 1907 – 14 October 1908	New Zealand Boxing Association	5	
Bob Rollo	1	14 October 1908	New Zealand Boxing Association	0	Rollo relinquished the title when he returned to Australia later in 1908.
Tim Tracey	2	28 January 1909 – 18 August 1909	New Zealand Boxing Association	3	
Rudy Unholz	1	18 August 1909	New Zealand Boxing Association	0	Unholz never defended his title.
Tim Tracey	3	25 September 1909 – 22 September 1911	New Zealand Boxing Association	6	
Billy Hannan	1	22 September 1911 – 9 November 1911	New Zealand Boxing Association	1	
Tim Tracey	4	9 November 1911 – 11 December 1911	New Zealand Boxing Association	2	
Alf Gault	1	11 December 1911 – 3 June 1912	New Zealand Boxing Association	2	
Peter Cook	1	3 June 1912 – 21 August 1912	New Zealand Boxing Association	1	
Len Porter	1	21 August 1912 – 11 December 1912	New Zealand Boxing Association	3	
Jimmy Hagerty	1	11 December 1912 – 31 January 1913	New Zealand Boxing Association	1	
Lyn Truscott	1	31 January 1913	New Zealand Boxing Association	0	Truscott never defended his title.
Jimmy Hagerty	2	12 February 1913 – 3 June 1913	New Zealand Boxing Association	2	
Len Porter	2	3 June 1913 – 1913	New Zealand Boxing Association	0	Porter stripped of title by NZBA later in 1913.
Jimmy Hagerty	3	12 August 1913 – 1914	New Zealand Boxing Association	4	Hagerty relinquished title. Cook was named Champion by NZBA later in 1914
Peter Cook	2	1914 – 2 November 1915	New Zealand Boxing Association	5	
Matt James	1	2 November 1915	New Zealand Boxing Association	1	James retires in 1919, vacating the title.
Gus Venn	1	5 May 1920 – 30 December 1920	New Zealand Boxing Association	1	Venn was award the title due to the vacant title opponent was overweight.
Jack Keenan	1	30 December 1920 – 26 March 1921	New Zealand Boxing Association	1	
Frank O'Neill	1	26 March 1921 – 10 November 1921	New Zealand Boxing Association	1	
Les Murray	1	10 November 1921 – 1926	New Zealand Boxing Association	5	Murray relinquished title in 1926.
Charlie Purdy	1	1927	New Zealand Boxing Association	0	Purdy who was awarded the title in 1927, had relinquished it without defending that same year.
Hector Leckie	1	4 October 1929 – 26 January 1931	New Zealand Boxing Association	1	
Harry Johns	1	26 January 1931 – 3 October 1932	New Zealand Boxing Association	2	Johns died of injuries sustained in his last defence.
Archie Hughes	1	3 October 1932 – 24 April 1933	New Zealand Boxing Association	2	
Ted Oxley	1	24 April 1933 – 3 March 1934	New Zealand Boxing Association	2	
Joe Franklin	1	3 March 1934 – 15 September 1934	New Zealand Boxing Association	0	Franklin stripped of title by NZBA September 15, 1934
Joe Franklin	2	14 December 1934 – 1915	New Zealand Boxing Association	0	Franklin retired in 1935, vacating the title.
Jack Jarvis	1	31 August 1935 – 13 August 1938	New Zealand Boxing Association	5	
Clarrie Rayner	1	13 August 1938 – 23 October 1939	New Zealand Boxing Association	4	
Jack Jarvis	2	23 October 1939 – 1945	New Zealand Boxing Association	1	Jarvis retired in 1945, vacating his titles.
Percy Kelly	1	8 December 1945 – 1 April 1946	New Zealand Boxing Association	1	
Young Jim Griffin	1	1 April 1946 – 28 May 1948	New Zealand Boxing Association	0	Griffin retired May 28, 1948, vacating the title.
Percy Kelly	2	16 November 1948 – September 1951	New Zealand Boxing Association	2	Kelly retired September 1951, vacating the title.
Syd Stevens	1	29 October 1951 – 14 February 1953	New Zealand Boxing Association	2	
Frank Wilson	1	14 February 1953 – 16 May 1955	New Zealand Boxing Association	1	
Johnny Hanks	1	16 May 1955 – 2 July 1956	New Zealand Boxing Association	1	
Joe McNally	1	2 July 1956 – 12 September 1960	New Zealand Boxing Association	5	Title vacated by Joe McNally's retirement. His last defence was on 18 July 1959.
Dion Murphy	1	10 October 1963	New Zealand Boxing Association	0	Murphy relinquished title without defending it.
Brian Maunsell	1	18 November 1965 – 19 May 1966	New Zealand Boxing Association	1	
Manny Santos	1	19 May 1966 – March 1967	New Zealand Boxing Association	0	Santos temporarily retired because of an eye injury and relinquished the title without defending it. Santos also held the Commonwealth title which also was relinquished.
Rex Redden	1	20 August 1970 – 25 February 1971	New Zealand Boxing Association	0	Redden retires in 1971, vacating the title.
Lance Austin	1	27 May 1994	New Zealand Boxing Association	0	Austin retired after winning this title.
Clinton Simmonds	1	1 September 1994	New Zealand Boxing Association	0	Simmonds vacated the title without defending.
Peter Warren	1	13 May 2000 – 4 November 2000	New Zealand Boxing Association	1	
Richard Pittman	1	30 June 2000	New Zealand Professional Boxing Association	0	
Santos Pakau	1	4 November 2000	New Zealand Boxing Association	1	Pakau last defence was 21 April 2001.
Nort Beauchamp	1	4 May 2019	New Zealand Professional Boxing Association	0	Beauchamp declared champion after no challenger.

== See also ==
- List of New Zealand world boxing champions
- List of New Zealand female boxing champions
- List of New Zealand heavyweight boxing champions
- List of New Zealand cruiserweight boxing champions
- List of New Zealand light heavyweight boxing champions
- List of New Zealand super middleweight boxing champions
- List of New Zealand middleweight boxing champions
- List of New Zealand super welterweight boxing champions
- List of New Zealand welterweight boxing champions
- List of New Zealand super lightweight boxing champions
- List of New Zealand super featherweight boxing champions
- List of New Zealand featherweight boxing champions
- List of New Zealand bantamweight boxing champions
- Professional boxing in New Zealand
