= List of New Zealand super welterweight boxing champions =

This list of New Zealand super welterweight boxing champions is a table showing the boxers who have won the New Zealand professional super welterweight championship.

The title has been administered by the New Zealand Boxing Association, New Zealand National Boxing Federation, New Zealand Professional Boxing Association and New Zealand Boxing Council since 1972.

A champion will often voluntarily relinquish the title in order to fight for a higher-ranked championship, such as the world. Where the date on which a champion relinquished the title is unclear.

Name	Reign	Duration of reign	Title	Defences	Note
EddieTavui	1	9 November 1972	New Zealand Boxing Association	0	
Fred Taufua	1	10 March 1983 – 18 February 1985	New Zealand Boxing Association	1	
Steve Renwick	1	18 February 1985	New Zealand Boxing Association	0	Title vacated by Renwick
Andy Sua	1	19 September 1991 – 15 June 1992	New Zealand Boxing Association	1	
Andy Creery	1	15 June 1992 – 5 November 1992	New Zealand Boxing Association	1	
Alberto MaChong	1	5 November 1992 – 9 December 1994	New Zealand Boxing Association	4	
Sean Sullivan	1	9 December 1994	New Zealand Boxing Association	0	Title vacated by Sullivan
Faaititi Fighter Seufale	1	18 September 1995	New Zealand Boxing Council	0	
Jason Rarere	1	28 April 1996	New Zealand Boxing Association	0	Rarere also won the WBA - PABA title on the bout.
Sean Sullivan	2	6 March 1999	New Zealand Boxing Association	0	
Lee Oti	1	21 September 2006	New Zealand Professional Boxing Association	0	
Lee Oti	2	21 September 2006	New Zealand National Boxing Federation	0	Oti won both titles on the same bout.
Beau O'Brien	1	7 December 2013	New Zealand Professional Boxing Association	0	
Cairo George	1	8 February 2014	New Zealand National Boxing Federation	0	
Daniel Roy Maxwell	1	25 April 2015 – 28 August 2015	New Zealand Professional Boxing Association	1	
Ricky Murphy	1	28 August 2015	New Zealand Professional Boxing Association	1	Stripped due to inactivity
Shay Brock	1	28 April 2017 – 22 June 2018	New Zealand Professional Boxing Association	1	
Bowyn Morgan	1	22 June 2018	New Zealand Professional Boxing Association	0	
Bowyn Morgan	2	15 December 2018	Pro Box NZ	0	Morgan also holds the NZNBF New Zealand Welterweight title. The belt was only up for grabs for Bowyn Morgan. If Morgan lost, the title would have remained vacant.
Andrei Mikhailovich	1	13 November 2018	Professional Boxing Commission New Zealand	1	Mikhailovich also holds the Pro Box NZ Middleweight title
Dylan Archer	1	25 July 2025	Professional Boxing Commission New Zealand	0	

== See also ==
- List of New Zealand world boxing champions
- List of New Zealand female boxing champions
- List of New Zealand heavyweight boxing champions
- List of New Zealand cruiserweight boxing champions
- List of New Zealand light heavyweight boxing champions
- List of New Zealand super middleweight boxing champions
- List of New Zealand middleweight boxing champions
- List of New Zealand welterweight boxing champions
- List of New Zealand super lightweight boxing champions
- List of New Zealand lightweight boxing champions
- List of New Zealand super featherweight boxing champions
- List of New Zealand featherweight boxing champions
- List of New Zealand bantamweight boxing champions
- Professional boxing in New Zealand
