= List of New Zealand cruiserweight boxing champions =

This list of New Zealand cruiserweight boxing champions is a table showing the boxers who have won the New Zealand professional cruiserweight championship.

The title has been administered by the New Zealand Boxing Association, New Zealand National Boxing Federation and New Zealand Professional Boxing Association since 1994.

A champion will often voluntarily relinquish the title in order to fight for a higher-ranked championship, such as the world. Where the date on which a champion relinquished the title is unclear.

Name	Reign	Duration of reign	Title	Defences	Note
Anthony Bigeni	1	26 May 1994	New Zealand Boxing Association	6	
Sam Leuii	1	10 October 2000	New Zealand National Boxing Federation	1	
Lightning Lupe	1	14 December 2000	New Zealand National Boxing Federation	0	
Mohamed Azzaoui	1	22 February 2003	New Zealand Boxing Association	0	
Colin Hunia	1	27 May 2004	New Zealand Boxing Association	0	Hunia is the last person to hold a title from New Zealand Boxing Association in all divisions.
Soulan Pownceby	1	28 August 2008	New Zealand National Boxing Federation	0	
Monty Filimaea	1	9 November 2013 – 26 June 2015	New Zealand National Boxing Federation	1	
Monty Filimaea	2	22 May 2014	New Zealand Professional Boxing Association	0	Filimaea Held both NZNBF and NZPBA titles at the same time.
James Langton	1	26 June 2015 – 3 November 2015	New Zealand National Boxing Federation	1	
Monty Betham Jnr	1	3 November 2015 – 29 October 2016	New Zealand National Boxing Federation	0	Vacated title when retired
Asher Derbyshire	1	29 April 2016	New Zealand Professional Boxing Association	1	
Lance Bryant	1	30 June 2016	New Zealand National Boxing Federation	1	Interim Champion. Champion promoted when Betham retired.
Lance Bryant	2	24 March 2018	Pro-Box NZ	0	
David Light	1	21 April 2018	Professional Boxing Commission New Zealand	1	
Joshua Francis	1	23 July 2021 – 21 July 2022	Professional Boxing Commission New Zealand	1	
Jerome Pampellone	1	21 July 2022	Professional Boxing Commission New Zealand	0	
John Parker	1	27 April 2024 – 14 November 2026	Pro Box NZ	1	
Kyle Mereweather	1	14 November 2026 – Present	Pro Box NZ	0	

== See also ==
- List of New Zealand world boxing champions
- List of New Zealand female boxing champions
- List of New Zealand heavyweight boxing champions
- List of New Zealand light heavyweight boxing champions
- List of New Zealand super middleweight boxing champions
- List of New Zealand middleweight boxing champions
- List of New Zealand super welterweight boxing champions
- List of New Zealand welterweight boxing champions
- List of New Zealand super lightweight boxing champions
- List of New Zealand lightweight boxing champions
- List of New Zealand super featherweight boxing champions
- List of New Zealand featherweight boxing champions
- List of New Zealand bantamweight boxing champions
- Professional boxing in New Zealand
