= Mea Motu =

New Zealand Māori boxer (born 1989)

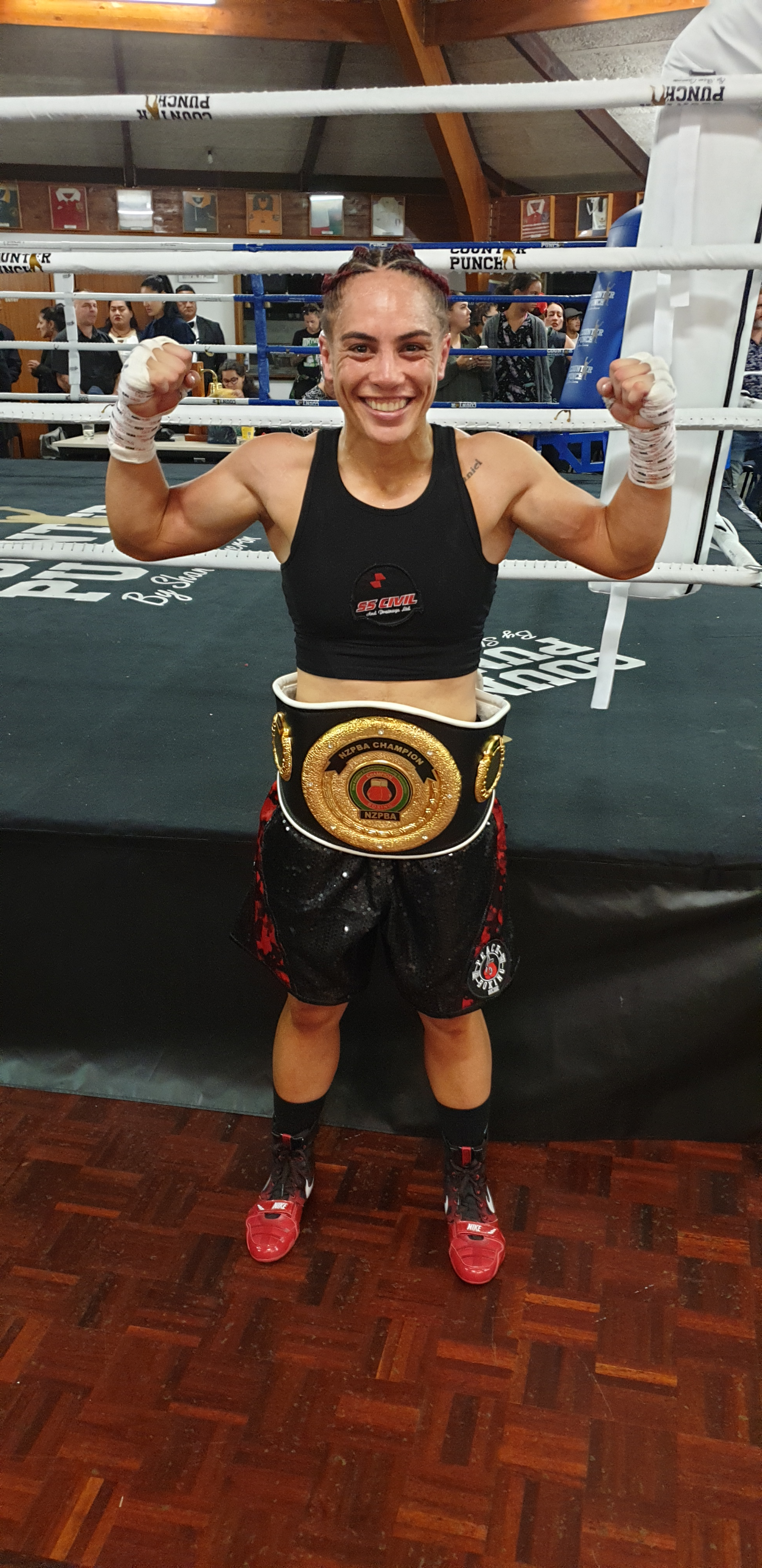
- Mea Motu with first New Zealand title

Personal information
- Nickname: The Nightmea
- Nationality: New Zealand
- Born: Marea Kirimiria Motu Pukepoto, New Zealand
- Weight: Super Lightweight; Lightweight; Super Featherweight; Featherweight; Super Bantamweight

Boxing career

Boxing record
- Total fights: 25
- Wins: 24
- Win by KO: 11
- Losses: 1
- Draws: 0

Marea Kirimiria Motu (30 December 1989 Pukepoto, New Zealand) is a New Zealand Māori professional boxer.

Motu is a former IBO World Super Bantamweight Champion. She is a four division New Zealand champion, holding more New Zealand titles than any other female boxer. She broke the 14-year record set by Daniella Smith for holding the most titles in February 2022.

== Amateur boxing ==
Motu discovered boxing at the age of 13. Motu is a five-time New Zealand amateur champion, winning two junior titles, and three elite senior titles. During her amateur career, Motu was trained by her mother Aloma Browne and fought alongside her sister Sally Motu, who also won a New Zealand National title. Motu was also trained by Chris Martin. Motu won a World boxing event that was open invitational called the Ringside Bowl World Championship. Motu's sister Sally fought at the Golden Gloves event in Queensland in 2016, unfortunately Mea was unable to compete due to injury. Motu met Isaac Peach during her amateur boxing years. Since 2020, Peach has been Motu's manager and trainer out of Peach Boxing.

== Professional boxing ==
=== Professional debut, four wins in three months 2020 ===
Motu made her professional boxing debut against City Kickboxing Kickboxer Wendy Talbot in October 2020. Motu won the fight by unanimous decision. Motu made her television fight debut when she took on Sally Kaokao at Sky City Theatre in November 2020. Motu won the fight in quick fashion, winning by stoppage in the second round for her first TKO win. In December 2020, Motu fought Ayisha Abied for the first time out of the three fight they have in the future. Motu won the fight by Unanimous Decision. Motu would return to television her next fight in late December 2020 against Katala Hansen. Motu would finish the fight in quick fashion, finishing the fight in 18 seconds.

=== Two time New Zealand Champion 2021 ===
In February 2021, Motu would take on Ayisha Abied for the second time in their trilogy. Motu won the fight by Unanimous Decision with her fighting the full six rounds for the first time. In March 2021, Motu took on Tania Reid for the New Zealand National Lightweight title. Reid was well known for being the first ever New Zealand female to win the Australasian title. Motu won the fight by third round stoppage in dominating fashion winning her first professional boxing title. In April 2021, Motu return to television when she fought Toni Moki. Motu won the fight by first round stoppage. After the fight, Motu reach the ranking of 1st on Boxrec and 3rd P4P on Boxrec. Motu would go on to fight Michaela Jenkins back to back in May and July 2021 with the second fight for the New Zealand national Super Lightweight title. Jenkins is a former New Zealand National (Pro Box NZ version) Welterweight champion which she won on a Joseph Parker undercard in December 2018. Motu will not only win both fights against Jenkins, she will also capture her second New Zealand title, but this time in the Super Lightweight division. After the fight, Motu was originally scheduled to fight for a WBA regional title against Australian Beck Hawker. Motu was also scheduled to fight Gentiane Lupi for the WBU World title. However, due to COVID-19 Lockdowns, both fights got cancelled. In August 2021, Motu finished off her year with a fight against Māori professional boxer Rangi Hetet. Motu won the fight by Split Decision.

=== Record Breaking New Zealand Champion, World Ranked 2022 ===
In February 2022, Motu took on Ayisha Abied for the New Zealand National Featherweight title. If Motu won the fight, she would break a 14-year record that Daniella Smith set that was tied with Lani Daniels, Geovana Peres, and herself. Motu won the fight by first round Knockout winning her third professional boxing title. In February 2022, it was announced a super fight between Motu and Baby Nansen will happen in 2022 as soon as the Auckland lockdowns were over. Motu and Nansen fought on 30 April for the New Zealand National Super Featherweight title The fight itself was messy and close, however, Motu won the fight capturing her fourth New Zealand title. After the fight, Motu made her intentions clear that she wanted to take on New Zealand born Australian, IBF World Super Bantamweight champion Cherneka Johnson. If a fight between Motu and Johnson happened for the world title, it would be the first time in boxing history that two Māori women would compete for a World title. It would be second time for two New Zealand women to compete for a world title behind Lani Daniels vs Geovana Peres for the WBO World title. In June 2022, Motu received her first major international ranking, with her being ranked 10th in the IBF Junior Lightweight division. On 19 August, Motu took on Thailand National Bantamweight champion Thanchanok Phanan for the vacant PBCNZ International Featherweight title. Motu stated she aims to make an impression by knocking out her opponent. Motu won the fight by 4th round stoppage. On 21 October, Motu took on former WBC World Bantamweight champion Usanakorn Thawilsuhannawang. This is the toughest and highest credential boxer Motu has fought so far in her career. Motu won the fight by Unanimous Decision winning every round of the fight. On 26 November, for the first time in her professional career, Motu fought overseas against undefeated Iran boxer Nastaran Fathi. This is the first time she will fight for a major regional title. Motu won the fight by Split Decision, winning the vacant WBC Asian Boxing Council Continental super bantamweight title. However, Motu received a bad cut during the fight. At the end of December 2022, Motu finished her boxing 2022 year with receiving a ranking of 7th in the WBA and 16th in the WBC in the Super Bantamweight division.

=== Third Māori World Champion 2023 ===
In March 2023, it was announced that Mea Motu will fight for the vacant IBO World super bantamweight title against canadian boxer Tania Walters. This will be the first time that boxing promoter Dean Lonergan will have a female main event on his boxing shows. On 27 April 2023, Mea Motu won the fight by unanimous decision, becoming the third Māori to win a World Boxing title. In August 2023, Motu took on Malawian boxer Ellen Simwaka to defend her IBO World title in a double header with Lani Daniels defending her World title on the same card. Motu won the fight by unanimous decision, overcoming a serious injury with a dislocated shoulder in the first round. For her last fight of 2023, she will fight for the first time in her boxing career in her hometown of Northland. On 7 November, it was announced that the event was sold out. Motu will take on Indian boxer Chandni Mehra. Motu won the fight by Unanimous decision. In February 2024, Motu and Peach Boxing announced their departure with Dean Lonergan D&L Events and had signed with No Limit Boxing under Matt and George Rose.

=== World title unification opportunity, move up to super featherweight 2024 - 2025 ===
Motu was scheduled to challenge IBF, WBO and Ring Magazine super-bantamweight World champion Ellie Scotney at the Co-op Live Arena in Manchester, England, on 26 October 2024, but Scotney withdrew from the fight due to injury. On 4 October 2024, Motu defeated Shannon O'Connell via stoppage in the fourth round of their scheduled eight round contest at The Star in Sydney, Australia. Motu unsuccessfully challenged Ellie Scotney for the WBO, IBF and Ring Magazine Super Bantamweight World titles as well as losing her IBO World Super Bantwamweight title on 26 January 2025, at Motorpoint Arena, Nottingham, England, losing by unanimous decision. After losing the world title fight, Motu moved up two weight divisions to Super Featherweight. Motu would go on to win the WBA Oceania Super Featherweight title against reigning champion Sara Jalonen, defeating her by unanimous decision at ABA Stadium on August 1, 2025. Motu would successfully defend her WBA Oceania title on November 14 at ABA Stadium, stopping her opponent Indian Manjot Rattu in 25 second in the first round.

== Boxing titles ==
=== Amateur titles ===
- New Zealand National Amateur Championships
  - 2002 New Zealand Junior Flyweight Gold Medalist
  - 2005 New Zealand Junior Super Lightweight Gold Medalist
  - 2006 New Zealand Super Lightweight Gold Medalist (unopposed)
  - 2007 New Zealand Lightweight Silver Medalist
  - 2015 New Zealand Featherweight Gold Medalist
  - 2016 New Zealand Bantamweight Silver Medalist
  - 2017 New Zealand Bantamweight Gold Medalist

=== Professional titles ===
- New Zealand Professional Boxing Association
  - New Zealand National Lightweight Champion
- Professional Boxing Commission New Zealand
  - New Zealand National Super Lightweight Champion
  - New Zealand National Featherweight Champion
  - New Zealand National Super Featherweight Champion
  - International Featherweight Champion
- World Boxing Council
  - Asian Boxing Council Continental Super Bantamweight Champion
- International Boxing Organization
  - World Super Bantamweight Champion
- World Boxing Association
  - Oceania Super Featherweight title

== Professional boxing record ==
| 25 fights | 24 wins | 1 loss |
|---|---|---|
| By knockout | 11 | 0 |
| By decision | 13 | 1 |

| No. | Result | Record | Opponent | Type | Round, time | Date | Location | Notes |
|---|---|---|---|---|---|---|---|---|
| 25 | Win | 24–1 | Siriphon Chanbuala | TKO | 1 (8) 0.25 | 8 February 2026 | Singmanassak Muaythai School, Pathum Thani, Thailand | |
| 24 | Win | 23–1 | Manjot Rattu | TKO | 1 (10) 0.25 | 14 November 2025 | ABA Stadium, Auckland, New Zealand | Defended WBA Oceania Super Featherweight title |
| 23 | Win | 22–1 | Sara Jalonen | UD | 10 | 1 August 2025 | ABA Stadium, Auckland, New Zealand | Won WBA Oceania Super Featherweight title |
| 22 | Win | 21–1 | Nantachat Wanpeng | TKO | 1 (6)1.25 | 17 May 2025 | Singmanassak Muaythai School, Pathum Thani, Thailand | |
| 21 | Loss | 20–1 | Ellie Scotney | UD | 10 | 26 Jan 2025 | Motorpoint Arena, Nottingham, England | For the IBO, IBF, WBO & The Ring female super-bantamweight titles |
| 20 | Win | 20–0 | Shannon O'Connell | TKO | 4 (8) 1.02 | 4 October 2024 | The Star, Sydney, Australia | |
| 19 | Win | 19–0 | Noppaket Srisawas | TKO | 2 (8) 0.59 | 26 April 2024 | ABA Stadium, Auckland, New Zealand | |
| 18 | Win | 18–0 | Chandni Mehra | UD | 10 | 2 Dec 2023 | McKay Stadium, Whangarei, New Zealand | Defended IBO Super Bantamweight World title |
| 17 | Win | 17–0 | Ellen Simwaka | UD | 10 | 26 Aug 2023 | Eventfinda Stadium, Auckland, New Zealand | Defended IBO Super Bantamweight World title |
| 16 | Win | 16–0 | Tania Walters | UD | 10 | 27 Apr 2023 | Eventfinda Stadium, Auckland, New Zealand | Won vacant IBO Super Bantamweight World title |
| 15 | Win | 15–0 | Nastaran Fathi | SD | 8 | 26 Nov 2022 | Hilton Palm Jumeirah, Dubai, United Arab Emirates | Won vacant WBC Asian Boxing Council Continental Super Bantamweight title |
| 14 | Win | 14–0 | Usanakorn Thawilsuhannawang | UD | 8 | 21 Oct 2022 | ABA Stadium, Auckland, New Zealand | Defended PBCNZ International Featherweight title |
| 13 | Win | 13–0 | Thanchanok Phanan | TKO | 4 (8) 1:39 | 19 Aug 2022 | ABA Stadium, Auckland, New Zealand | Won vacant PBCNZ International Featherweight title |
| 12 | Win | 12–0 | Baby Nansen | UD | 8 | 30 Apr 2022 | ABA Stadium, Auckland, New Zealand | Won vacant New Zealand National (PBCNZ version) Super Featherweight title |
| 11 | Win | 11–0 | Ayisha Abied | KO | 1 (8) 1:25 | 12 Feb 2022 | ABA Stadium, Auckland, New Zealand | Won vacant New Zealand National (PBCNZ version) Featherweight title |
| 10 | Win | 10–0 | Rangi Hetet | SD | 5 | 7 Aug 2021 | Te Rapa Racecourse, Hamilton, New Zealand | |
| 9 | Win | 9–0 | Michaela Jenkins | UD | 8 | 3 Jul 2021 | ABA Stadium, Auckland, New Zealand | Won vacant New Zealand National (PBCNZ version) Super Lightweight title |
| 8 | Win | 8–0 | Michaela Jenkins | UD | 4 | 8 May 2021 | ABA Stadium, Auckland, New Zealand | |
| 7 | Win | 7–0 | Toni Moki | TKO | 1 (4), 1:59 | 9 Apr 2021 | Sky City Theatre, Auckland, New Zealand | |
| 6 | Win | 6–0 | Tania Reid | TKO | 3 (8) | 26 Mar 2021 | Takapuna Rugby Football Club, Auckland, New Zealand | Won vacant New Zealand National (NZPBA version) Lightweight title |
| 5 | Win | 5–0 | Ayisha Abied | UD | 6 | 13 Feb 2021 | ABA Stadium, Auckland, New Zealand | |
| 4 | Win | 4–0 | Katala Hansen | TKO | 1 (4) 0:18 | 19 Dec 2020 | ABA Stadium, Auckland, New Zealand | |
| 3 | Win | 3–0 | Ayisha Abied | UD | 4 | 5 Dec 2020 | Waitemata Rugby League Club, Auckland, New Zealand | |
| 2 | Win | 2–0 | Sally Kaokao | TKO | 2 (4) 1:59 | 13 Nov 2020 | Sky City Theatre, Auckland, New Zealand | |
| 1 | Win | 1–0 | Wendy Talbot | UD | 4 | 17 Oct 2020 | ABA Stadium, Auckland, New Zealand | |

== Personal life ==
Motu was born and raised in the small village of Pukepoto which is outside of Kaitaia. Motu a New Zealand Māori with decedents of Te Rarawa and Ngāpuhi. Motu is a mother of four children, with her eldest David a championship Bowler. Motu was raised in the small town of Pukepoto. She moved to South Auckland when she was 10 years old. Motu got pregnant with her first child at the age of 17 with her boyfriend at the time. She would eventually marry her boyfriend. She would go through bad times with her family when she was living homeless. Motu would leave her husband after years of domestic violence abuse and her husband went to prison. For a short time, Motu moved to Australia where she met her new partner. This helped her turn her life around for the better. She moved back to New Zealand where she started train back in boxing.

In 2024, she was forced to medically retire from Celebrity Treasure Island as her high muscle mass and lack of body fat made her susceptible to hypothermia and exposed underlying respiratory conditions after the team challenge in a cold and stormy conditions was cancelled with all results annulled.

== Awards ==
- New Zealand Boxing Awards
  - 2020 Female Newcomer of the year (Won)
  - 2020 Debut of the year (Won)
  - 2020 Female Boxer of the year (Won)
  - 2020 Boxer of the year (Won)
  - 2021 Female Boxer of the year (Won)
  - 2021 New Zealand National Champion of the year (Won)
  - 2022 Most entertaining boxer of the year (Won)
  - 2022 New Zealand National Champion of the year (Won)
  - 2022 Female Boxer of the year (Won)
  - 2022 New Zealand Boxer of the year (Won)
  - 2023 Most entertaining boxer of the year (Won)
  - 2023 Female Boxer of the year (Won)
  - 2023 New Zealand Boxer of the year (Won)
- Te Tai Tokerau Māori Sports Awards
  - 2023 Te Tohu TaKaro Toa Wahine Outstanding Sportswoman Award (Nominated)
- Māori Sports Awards
  - 2023 Te Pikinga o Tawhaki Individual Māori World Champions (Won)
- Halberg Awards
  - 2023 High Performance Sport New Zealand Sportswoman of the Year (Nominated)
  - New Zealand’s Favourite Sporting Moment of the Year (Nominated)
