= Isaac Peach =

New Zealand Boxing Coach

Personal information
- Nationality: New Zealand
- Born: January 19, 1982 (age 44) Auckland, New Zealand
- Weight: Super Middleweight

Boxing career

Boxing record
- Total fights: 13
- Wins: 12
- Win by KO: 2
- Losses: 1
- Draws: 0

Isaac Peach (born 19 January 1982) is a New Zealand retired professional boxer, a current boxing coach and owner of Peach Boxing. Peach trained multiple talented boxers including former IBO World Champion Mea Motu, World title contender David Light, World title contender Andrei Mikhailovich and interim World title contender Jerome Pampellone. Peach is well known to have the philosophy in his gym to have his boxers take on any opponent. Peach Boxing Gym is considered the best boxing gym in New Zealand, rivaling the status of City Kickboxing in MMA.

== Boxing career ==
=== Amateur boxing ===
In July 2007, Peach competed at the Canterbury invitation boxing event where Canterbury boxers took on boxers from Wellington, Auckland and Tauranga. At the 2007 New Zealand National amateur championships, Peach won the quarter finals bout, however, would lose in the Semi Finals. In 2008, Peach was chosen as part of the New Zealand Boxing Squad to compete at the Oceania Boxing Championship. If Peach got a gold medal he would qualify for the Olympics. Peach would compete at the North Island Golden Gloves later in the year. Peach would compete at the 2008 New Zealand National amateur championships but would not get past the quarter finals. In 2009, Peach won his first New Zealand national amateur boxing championships.

=== Professional boxing ===
In June 2010, Peach made his professional boxing debut against Moses Ioelu. Peach would win by unanimous decision. In August 2011, Peach made his TV debut where he fought on the undercard of David Tua vs Monte Barrett II. Peach took on Gunnar Jackson which was live on Sky Sports. Peach won the fight by unanimous decision. In June 2012, Peach fought Steven Anderson in a rematch for the vacant New Zealand national Super Middleweight title. The two had fought in April 2011 with Anderson winning by split decision. Peach won the title fight after an accidental head clash caused a cut in the 7th round. Peach won by technical unanimous decision. A month later, Peach returned to TV boxing where he fought on the Shane Cameron vs Monte Barrett undercard. Peach won the fight by fourth-round knockout. In December 2013, at the age of 31, after having shoulder surgery had decided to have his last fight against Fili Mailata. Peach won the fight by fifth-round knockout.

== Coaching career ==
=== David Light ===
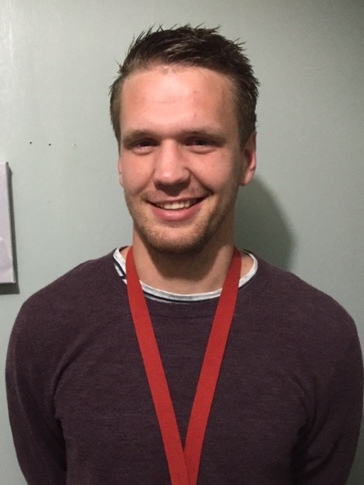
Commonwealth Silver Medal

Peach and David Light used to train together under Dr. John McKay. Peach started training Light in 2017 for his pro career when Peach called Light and invited him to train at the gym. In 2019, Peach promoted Light's fight against former world title contender Mark Flanagan for the WBO Oriental cruiserweight title. In December 2022, Light fought in Florida to take on Brandon Glanton in a world title eliminator. Light won the fight by split decision. Light for the WBO cruiserweight title against Lawrence Okolie in March 2023. Peach said Light was fully prepared for the world title fight and has no excuses no matter what the result. Light lost the fight by unanimous decision. A couple of months after the fight, Peach announced that Light had suffered a stroke as a result of the world title fight. Peach stated they gym felt absolutely devastated.

=== Andrei Mikhailovich ===
When Mikhailovich was 15, he met Peach at a boxing gym. He said when referring to Peach "Isaac has played a huge part in my life". Peach is happy how everything is going into for Mikhailovich career and is one win away from a world title fight. It was announced that Mikhailovich will take on Denis Radovan in a world title eliminator. Peach believes that Denis Radovan he is a good fight but does not have the X Factor that you need in Boxing. Peach believe Mikhailovich has the X Factor. When the fight got postponed, Peach had to tell Mikhailovich the news. He describe it like telling someone that they someone died. Mikhailovich was booked for a unified world title shot against Janibek Alimkhanuly, however, the fight was called off last minute due to Alimkhanuly suffering from server dehydration. The fight would be postponed to October where only the IBF title was on the line, however, Mikhailovich would lose by ninth round stoppage. Mikhailovich would leave Isaac Peach and Peach boxing in 2025.

=== Jerome Pampellone ===
Pampellone started off training with Peach first as a corporate boxer and then a well accomplished amateur boxer. Pampellone and Peach were neighbours when they first meet. Peach would train him to be both a boxer and a Plumber as Pampellone did his apprentiship under Peach. He believes that Pampellone is not only one of the nicest people in the world but one of the best boxer as he is very dangerous in the ring. Pampellone biggest accomplishment is when he fought for an interim world title, becoming an interim world title contender. He has also fought in two world title eliminators.

=== Mea Motu ===
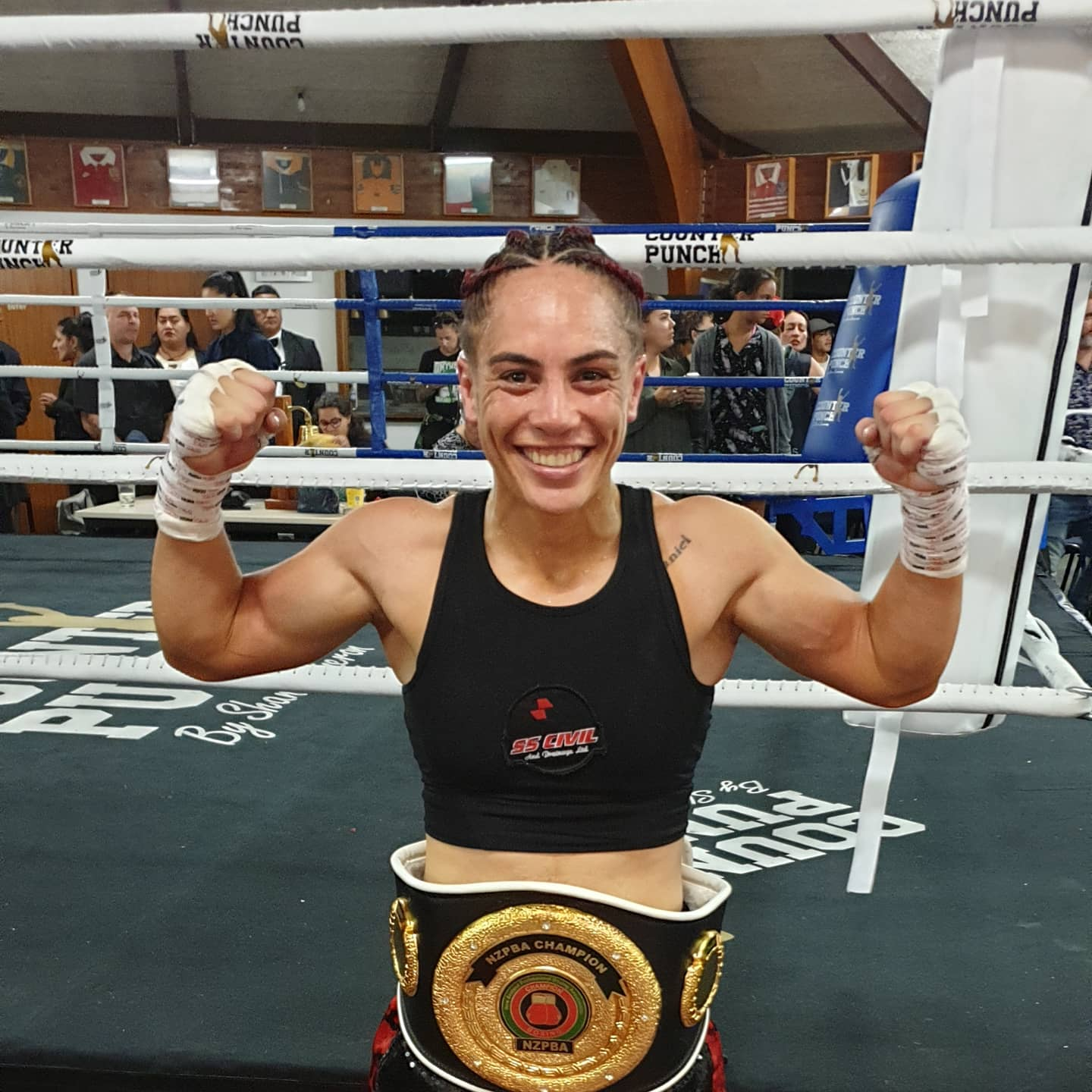
Mea Motu after first New Zealand title win

Motu met Peach at a young age shortly after she began boxing at the age of 13. After escaping an abusive relationship, Motu was invited to join Peach Boxing team. Motu originally aimed to just lose weight at the gym, but Peach encouraged her to compete as a boxer. Peach had promoted a lot of Motu earlier fights. Peach has said his number one goal was to get Motu a world title. In April 2023, Motu won the IBO World Super Bantamweight title. In August 2023, Peach threaten to pull Motu out of her world title defence after the referee that was selected had controversially scored against Kiki Toa Leutele the week before. Peach continued on with the fight as the Sanctioning bodies gave him no other options. Peach was not impressed with the conversations he had with the sanctioning body and officials. Motu would win the fight despite dislocating her shoulder in the first round. Peach wants to put Motu is hard fights, and to have her compete with some of the best in the world. It is known that Peach 8-year-old son Zen helps train Motu. In December 2023, both Motu and Peach were nominated for a Halberg Award. Motu unsuccessfully challenged Ellie Scotney for the WBO, IBF and Ring Magazine Super Bantamweight World titles as well as losing her IBO World Super Bantwamweight title on 26 January 2025, at Motorpoint Arena, Nottingham, England, losing by unanimous decision.

=== Kiki Toa Leutele ===
Leutele started training with Peach when he fought Demsey McKean in May 2021. In November 2022, Leutele fought Justis Huni in Australia. Peach stated that his team was treated with disrespect as Huni team tried to skip to fight for different opponents. Leutele lost the fight by unanimous decision. In August 2023, Leutele fought Toese Vousiutu in Australia which Leutele won by split decision. Peach blasted the judge who scored the fight the other way and would pull boxers out of fights if that judge was involved.

=== Amato Mataika ===
Amato "Matt" Mataika trained under Peach from 2022. Mataika fought on the Mea Motu World title undercard winning against Joseph Tufuga by unanimous decision. Mataika had to switch his boxing allegiance to Tonga due to lack of funding from New Zealand. Peach explored the options to pay for the 12,000 bill that comes with competing at the Olympic qualifiers and switching to Tongan boxing team was the best idea. Mataika left Peach boxing in 2024.

=== Amateur boxers ===
In March 2015, Boaz Peach, trained by his brother Isaac, competed in KeriKeri.

Peach has a stable of amateur boxers including Omid Azizi, Sonny Morini, Erin Walsh and others.

=== Celebrity and corporate boxing ===
In September 2015, Shortland Street star Jesse Peach which is which is trained by his brother Isaac Peach. would compete in a celebrity boxing fight on Dean Lonergans Fight for life against musician Shelton Woolright.

In 2022, Peach trained Rugby league James Gavet against Liam Messam for 2022 Fight for Life.

In 2023, Peach trained rugby player Sam Tuitupou against Roy Asotasi for 2023 Fight for life. Tuitupou won the fight by devastating knockout in ten seconds within the first round. Peach also trained DJ Forbes in the same event against Sione Faumuina.

== Boxing titles ==
=== Amateur Boxing titles ===
- Australian Golden Gloves
  - 2007 Golden Gloves Middleweight Gold Medalist
- Ringside World Championship
  - 2008 World Middleweight Silver Medalist
- New Zealand National Amateur Championships
  - 2009 New Zealand Middleweight Gold Medalist

=== Professional Boxing titles ===
- New Zealand National Boxing Federation
  - New Zealand National Super Middleweight title

=== Couch Boxing titles ===
- Boxing New Zealand
  - Joe Thwaites Sheild (2019)
  - Gary Anderson Cup (2021)

== Professional boxing record ==
13 fights	12 wins	1 loss
By knockout	2	0
By decision	10	1

No.	Result	Record	Opponent	Type	Round, time	Date	Location	Notes
13	Win	12–1	Fili Mailata	TKO	5 (6)	14 Dec 2013	ABA Stadium, Auckland, New Zealand	
12	Win	11–1	Fili Mailata	UD	4	2 Nov 2012	ABA Stadium, Auckland, New Zealand	
11	Win	10–1	James Uoka	TKO	4 (4)	12 Feb 2022	Sky City Convention Centre, Auckland, New Zealand	
10	Win	9–1	Steven Anderson	TD	7 (10) 2:23	1 Jun 2012	ABA Stadium, Auckland, New Zealand	won vacant New Zealand National (NZNBF version) Suoer Middleweight title
9	Win	8–1	Peter Tovi'o	UD	4	23 Mar 2012	ABA Stadium, Auckland, New Zealand	
8	Win	7–1	Gunnar Jackson	UD	6	13 Aug 2011	Telstra Clear Events Centre, Auckland, New Zealand	
7	Win	6–1	Dickey Peirera	UD	6	5 Aug 2011	Takapuna Rugby Football Club, Auckland, New Zealand	
6	Loss	5–1	Steven Anderson	SD	6	28 Apr 2011	ABA Stadium, Auckland, New Zealand	
5	Win	5–0	Edwin Samy	UD	6	4 Mar 2011	ASB Stadium, Auckland, New Zealand	
4	Win	4–0	Paz Viejo	UD	4	27 Nov 2010	ABA Stadium, Auckland, New Zealand	
3	Win	3–0	Paz Viejo	UD	4	16 Oct 2010	ABA Stadium, Auckland, New Zealand	
2	Win	2–0	Jamie Waru	UD	4	9 Jul 2010	Coral Reef Restaurant, Auckland, New Zealand	
1	Win	1–0	Moses Ioelu	UD	4	17 Jun 2010	ABA Stadium, Auckland, New Zealand	

== Personal life ==
Peach is married to Alina Peach. Together they co promote all their shows as well as train wall their boxers together. They have four kids together. Outside of boxing, Peach is a Plumber. Both Isaac and Alina were trained by Dr John McKay. In 2022, Peach has been sober for five years.

== Awards ==
- Halberg Awards
  - 2023 Coach of the Year (Nominated)
- New Zealand Boxing Awards
  - 2019 Trainer of the year (Nominated)
  - 2019 Promoter of the year (Nominated)
  - 2020 Promoter of the year (Won)
  - 2020 Trainer of the year (Won)
  - 2020 Gym of the year (Won)
  - 2021 Promoter of the year (Won)
  - 2021 Trainer of the year (Won)
  - 2021 Gym of the year (Won)
  - 2021 Matchmaker of the year (Won)
  - 2022 Trainer of the year (Won)
  - 2022 Gym of the year (Won)
  - 2023 Trainer of the year (Won)
  - 2023 Gym of the year (Won)
