= List of New Zealand bantamweight boxing champions =

This list of New Zealand bantamweight boxing champions is a table showing the boxers who have won the New Zealand professional bantamweight championship. The title has been administered by the New Zealand Boxing Association since 1914. A champion will often voluntarily relinquish the title in order to fight for a higher-ranked championship, such as the world.

Name	Reign	Duration of reign	Title	Defences	Note
Jack Ladbury	1	15 April 1915 – January 1920	New Zealand Boxing Association	0	Ladbury was stripped of the title for failure to defend in January 1920.
Charlie Cann	1	January 1920 – 20 October 1920	New Zealand Boxing Association	2	Cann was awarded the title due to Ladbury's lack of defence. Cann successfully defended the title in May of that year.
Harry Gunn	1	20 October 1920 – 2 January 1922	New Zealand Boxing Association	1	
Charlie Cann	2	2 January 1922 – 1926	New Zealand Boxing Association	1	Cann retired in 1926, vacating the title.
Frank Taylor	1	12 April 1930 – 1932	New Zealand Boxing Association	1	Taylor retired in 1932, vacating the title.
George T Wright	1	8 August 1932 – 1934	New Zealand Boxing Association	2	Wright retired in 1934, vacating the title.
Tot Hoggarth	1	26 October 1940 – 21 January 1948	New Zealand Boxing Association	2	
Lyn Philp	1	21 January 1948 – 6 June 1954	New Zealand Boxing Association	0	Philp retired on 6 June 1954, vacating the title.

== See also ==
- List of New Zealand world boxing champions
- List of New Zealand female boxing champions
- List of New Zealand heavyweight boxing champions
- List of New Zealand cruiserweight boxing champions
- List of New Zealand light heavyweight boxing champions
- List of New Zealand super middleweight boxing champions
- List of New Zealand middleweight boxing champions
- List of New Zealand super welterweight boxing champions
- List of New Zealand welterweight boxing champions
- List of New Zealand super lightweight boxing champions
- List of New Zealand lightweight boxing champions
- List of New Zealand super featherweight boxing champions
- List of New Zealand featherweight boxing champions
- Professional boxing in New Zealand
