= List of New Zealand light heavyweight boxing champions =

This list of New Zealand light heavyweight boxing champions is a table showing the boxers who have won the New Zealand professional light heavyweight championship. The title has been administered by the New Zealand Boxing Association, New Zealand National Boxing Federation, New Zealand Boxing Council and New Zealand Professional Boxing Association since 1922. A champion will often voluntarily relinquish the title in order to fight for a higher-ranked championship, such as the world. Where the date on which a champion relinquished the title is unclear.

Name	Reign	Duration of reign	Title	Defences	Note
Brian McCleary	1	9 September 1922 – 3 May 1923	New Zealand Boxing Association	3	
Ed Parker	1	3 May 1923 – 12 August 1929	New Zealand Boxing Association	4	Parker was stripped of the title for being overweight. Title was award to Jim Broadfoot despite the fact that Broadfoot lost the bout.
Jim Broadfoot	1	12 August 1929 – 12 March 1930	New Zealand Boxing Association	1	
Artie Hay	1	12 March 1930	New Zealand Boxing Association	0	Hay Vacated the title shortly after due to retirement.
Jim Broadfoot	2	2 May 1931 – 15 February 1932	New Zealand Boxing Association	3	
Ray Nicol	1	15 February 1932 – 14 February 1936	New Zealand Boxing Association	6	
Harold Reeve	1	14 February 1936 – 29 October 1937	New Zealand Boxing Association	1	
Ern Jacobs	1	29 October 1937	New Zealand Boxing Association	0	Jacobs Vacated the title shortly after due to retirement.
Stan Jenkin	1	22 June 1939 – 5 March 1940	New Zealand Boxing Association	1	Jenkin died on 5 March 1940.
Cliff Hanham	1	27 June 1940	New Zealand Boxing Association	2	Hanham Vacated the title shortly after due to retirement.
Roy Stevens	1	29 October 1945 – 15 February 1947	New Zealand Boxing Association	1	
Doug Rollinson	1	15 February 1947	New Zealand Boxing Association	0	Rollinson Vacated the title shortly after due to retirement.
Tommy Downes	1	21 March 1949 – 23 May 1949	New Zealand Boxing Association	1	
Barney Clarke	1	23 May 1949 – 18 August 1949	New Zealand Boxing Association	1	
Roy Stevens	2	18 August 1949	New Zealand Boxing Association	0	Stevens Vacated the title shortly after due to retirement.
Russ Broughton	1	7 October 1950	New Zealand Boxing Association	0	Broughton Vacated the title.
Chub Keith	1	9 July 1951	New Zealand Boxing Association	0	Keith Vacated the title shortly after due to retirement.
Johnny Halafihi	1	16 April 1956	New Zealand Boxing Association	0	Halafihi Vacated the title shortly after due to retirement.
Charley Beaton	1	13 July 1957	New Zealand Boxing Association	0	Beaton Vacated the title shortly after due to retirement.
Johnny Nomura	1	17 April 1961 – 4 August 1962	New Zealand Boxing Association	1	
Earl Nikora	1	4 August 1962 – 17 May 1965	New Zealand Boxing Association	2	
Filo Manuoa	1	17 May 1965 – 29 November 1965	New Zealand Boxing Association	1	
Mike Leuii	1	29 November 1965	New Zealand Boxing Association	0	Leuii vacated the title as he was deported from New Zealand.
Eddie Wulf	1	22 April 1971	New Zealand Boxing Association	0	
Joe Jackson	1	13 February 1974	New Zealand Boxing Association	0	
Lance Revill	1	11 June 1979 – 13 April 1980	New Zealand Boxing Association	1	
Monty Betham	1	13 April 1980	New Zealand Boxing Association	1	Betham Vacated the title.
Alex Sua	1	10 March 1982	New Zealand Boxing Association	1	
Raeli Raeli	1	24 April 1990	New Zealand Boxing Council	0	
Allan McNamara	1	30 May 1994	New Zealand Boxing Association	1	
Timo Masua	1	5 September 1999	New Zealand Boxing Association	0	
Sean Sullivan	1	9 August 2002	New Zealand Boxing Association	0	
Sean Sullivan	2	11 April 2003	New Zealand National Boxing Federation	0	Sullivan held both titles.
Robert Berridge	1	28 March 2013 – 2 June 2017	New Zealand Professional Boxing Association	2	Berridge was awarded the title due to lack of challenges. NZPBA presented the title to Berridge after a non-title bout against Moses Ioelu. The bout was scheduled for 4 x 3 minute rounds. Berridge retired at the end of his title reign.
Sam Rapira	1	12 September 2014 – 16 October 2014	New Zealand National Boxing Federation	1	
Reece Papuni	1	16 October 2014	New Zealand National Boxing Federation	0	
Tyrone Warren	1	25 November 2017	New Zealand National Boxing Federation	0	
Ratu Dawai	1	19 May 2018	New Zealand Professional Boxing Commission	0	
Zane Hopman	1	30 October 2020 – 4 January 2020	Pro Box New Zealand	0	Hopman retired ending his title reign.
Michael Helg	1	8 June 2024 – Present	New Zealand Professional Boxing Commission	0	

== See also ==
- List of New Zealand world boxing champions
- List of New Zealand female boxing champions
- List of New Zealand heavyweight boxing champions
- List of New Zealand cruiserweight boxing champions
- List of New Zealand super middleweight boxing champions
- List of New Zealand middleweight boxing champions
- List of New Zealand super welterweight boxing champions
- List of New Zealand welterweight boxing champions
- List of New Zealand super lightweight boxing champions
- List of New Zealand lightweight boxing champions
- List of New Zealand super featherweight boxing champions
- List of New Zealand featherweight boxing champions
- List of New Zealand bantamweight boxing champions
- Professional boxing in New Zealand
