= List of New Zealand featherweight boxing champions =

This list of New Zealand featherweight boxing champions is a table showing the boxers who have won the New Zealand professional featherweight championship.

The title has been administered by the New Zealand Boxing Association since 1907.

A champion will often voluntarily relinquish the title in order to fight for a higher-ranked championship, such as the world.

== List of New Zealand featherweight boxing champions ==
Name	Reign	Duration of reign	Title	Defences	Note
Alf Gault	1	15 July 1907	New Zealand Boxing Association	0	
Torpedo Billy Murphy	1	8 August 1907	New Zealand Boxing Association	0	
James Godfrey	1	25 November 1907 – 22 December 1908	New Zealand Boxing Association	1	
Billy Elliott	1	22 December 1908	New Zealand Boxing Association	0	Vacated title
Jimmy Hagerty	1	24 April 1912 – 1914	New Zealand Boxing Association	1	Relinquished title
Gus Venn	1	29 July 1914 – 1915	New Zealand Boxing Association	0	Relinquished title
Lin Robinson	1	26 June 1919 – 3 June 1922	New Zealand Boxing Association	5	
Duke Maddox	1	3 June 1922 – 11 December 1922	New Zealand Boxing Association	2	
Harry Gunn	1	11 December 1922 – 31 March 1923	New Zealand Boxing Association	1	
Mike Flynn	1	31 March 1923 – 1924	New Zealand Boxing Association	1	Relinquished title
George Curran	1	17 May 1924 – 6 October 1924	New Zealand Boxing Association	2	
Bert Brown	1	6 October 1924 – 4 April 1925	New Zealand Boxing Association	1	
Lin Robinson	2	4 April 1925 – 5 May 1927	New Zealand Boxing Association	3	Bert Brown forfeited the title to Robinson due to Brown being overweight. The bout still went ahead, with Brown winning by points.
Duke Maddox	2	5 May 1927 – 22 August 1927	New Zealand Boxing Association	1	
Johnnie Leckie	1	22 August 1927 – 29 November 1930	New Zealand Boxing Association	4	
Tommy Donovan	1	29 November 1930 – 31 October 1931	New Zealand Boxing Association	1	
Johnnie Leckie	2	31 October 1931 – 2 October 1933	New Zealand Boxing Association	1	
Percy Hawes	1	2 October 1933 – 16 December 1933	New Zealand Boxing Association	2	
Clarrie Rayner	1	16 December 1933 – 10 February 1936	New Zealand Boxing Association	6	
Billy Aitken	1	10 February 1936 – 26 May 1936	New Zealand Boxing Association	0	Aitken stripped of title
Lex Greaney	1	8 June 1939 – 14 October 1944	New Zealand Boxing Association	1	
Clarrie Rayner	2	14 October 1944 – 12 March 1946	New Zealand Boxing Association	2	
Tom Baty	1	12 March 1946 – 1947	New Zealand Boxing Association	0	Batty retired in 1947, vacating the title.
Johnny Hanks	1	14 June 1954 – 15 April 1957	New Zealand Boxing Association	1	
Billy Leckie	1	15 April 1957 – 7 September 1961	New Zealand Boxing Association	2	
Jimmy Cassidy	1	7 September 1961	New Zealand Boxing Association	0	
Toro George	1	8 June 1966	New Zealand Boxing Association	1	George was awarded the title without beating anyone for the title. He successfully defended the title on 15 September 1966.
Nick Fletcher	1	26 November 1992	New Zealand Boxing Association	0	

== List of New Zealand super featherweight boxing champions ==
Name Shane Samuel	Reign 1992	Duration of reign	Title	Defences Beat Jonny Wallace in NZ final	Note Check Elite amateur nz boxing titles also Shane Samuel won Lightweight nz title in 1990	shane samuel	1	17 July 1992	New Zealand Boxing Association	0

== See also ==
- List of New Zealand world boxing champions
- List of New Zealand female boxing champions
- List of New Zealand heavyweight boxing champions
- List of New Zealand cruiserweight boxing champions
- List of New Zealand light heavyweight boxing champions
- List of New Zealand super middleweight boxing champions
- List of New Zealand middleweight boxing champions
- List of New Zealand super welterweight boxing champions
- List of New Zealand welterweight boxing champions
- List of New Zealand super lightweight boxing champions
- List of New Zealand lightweight boxing champions
- List of New Zealand bantamweight boxing champions
- Professional boxing in New Zealand
