= List of New Zealand super lightweight boxing champions =

This list of New Zealand lightweight boxing champions is a table showing the boxers who have won the New Zealand professional Super lightweight championship. The title has been administered by the New Zealand Boxing Association, New Zealand National Boxing Federation and New Zealand Boxing Council since 1983. A champion will often voluntarily relinquish the title in order to fight for a higher-ranked championship, such as the world. Where the date on which a champion relinquished the title is unclear.

Name	Reign	Duration of reign	Title	Defences	Note
David Stowers	1	30 March 1983	New Zealand Boxing Association	0	
Sam Aukuso	1	1 September 1994	New Zealand Boxing Association	0	
Jamie Waru	1	9 May 2002	New Zealand Boxing Council	0	Waru is the last person to hold a title from New Zealand Boxing Council.
Guillermo Mosquera	1	25 March 2004	New Zealand Boxing Association	0	
Leki Maka	1	21 November 2015	New Zealand National Boxing Federation	0	
Shiva Mishra	1	15 February 2020	Pro Box New Zealand	0	

== See also ==
- List of New Zealand world boxing champions
- List of New Zealand female boxing champions
- List of New Zealand heavyweight boxing champions
- List of New Zealand cruiserweight boxing champions
- List of New Zealand light heavyweight boxing champions
- List of New Zealand super middleweight boxing champions
- List of New Zealand middleweight boxing champions
- List of New Zealand super welterweight boxing champions
- List of New Zealand welterweight boxing champions
- List of New Zealand lightweight boxing champions
- List of New Zealand super featherweight boxing champions
- List of New Zealand featherweight boxing champions
- List of New Zealand bantamweight boxing champions
- Professional boxing in New Zealand
