= Barry Brown (boxer) =

New Zealand boxer

Personal information
- Nationality: New Zealander
- Born: Barrington Reginald Brown; 20 May 1931 Dannevirke, New Zealand
- Died: 1 November 2004 (aged 73)
- Height: 5 ft 11 in (1.80 m)
- Weight: welter/middleweight

Boxing career
- Stance: Southpaw

Boxing record
- Total fights: 31
- Wins: 27 (KO 21)
- Losses: 4 (KO 3)
- Draws: 0

Barrington Reginald "Barry" Brown (20 May 1931 – 1 November 2004) was a New Zealand professional welter/middleweight boxer of the 1950s who won the New Zealand Boxing Association welterweight title, New Zealand Boxing Association middleweight title, and British Empire welterweight title, his professional fighting weight varied from 145 lb (66 kg; 10 st 5 lb), i.e. welterweight to 158 lb (72 kg; 11 st 4 lb), i.e. middleweight.
