= Jerome Pampellone =

New Zealand boxer (born 1996)

Personal information
- Nickname: The Panther
- Nationality: New Zealander
- Born: Jerome Mandela Joseph-Pampellone; 12 July 1996 (age 30) London, England
- Height: 1.83 m (6 ft 0 in)
- Weight: Light heavyweight Cruiserweight; Heavyweight

Boxing career
- Reach: 190 cm (75 in)
- Stance: Orthodox

Boxing record
- Total fights: 22
- Wins: 19
- Win by KO: 12
- Losses: 3

Jerome Mandela Joseph-Pampellone (born 12 July 1996) is an English-born, New Zealand raised professional boxer. He participated in the 2019 AIBA World Boxing Championships as an amateur and won three New Zealand national elite championships from 2018 till 2020. Pampellone narrowly missed qualifying for the 2020 Summer Olympics after failing to place at the Olympic Qualification Tournament for 2020 in Asia and Oceania.

In his professional career, he is a New Zealand National Cruiserweight champion and a two division IBF Australasian champion, holding titles in the Cruiserweight and Light Heavyweight division. In 2025 he became an Interim WBA World title challenger when he fought Albert Ramirez for the title.

== Early life ==
Pampellone was born in London. He moved to New Zealand with his family at the age of 10. Pampellone attended Kelston Boys High School, known to have produced many sporting greats. Pampellone is of Trinidad descent.

== Amateur career ==
=== Debut, New Zealand National Championship (2016–2018) ===
Pampellone began his boxing career as a corporate boxer before going into amateur boxing. He competed in his first national championship in 2017, when he lost in the preliminary rounds. At the 2018 New Zealand National Championships, Pampellone went on to fight the winner of the 2017 championships Sunny Teki-Clark in the finals. Pampellone won the fight by unanimous decision.

=== International flights, World Championship tournament, Olympic Qualification (2019–2021) ===
In July 2019, Pampellone competed at the Thailand Open International Boxing Tournament. Pampellone won the preliminary rounds against Australian Jack Bowen but lost in the quarter finals against Thailand boxer Saranon Klompan. In September 2019, Pampellone compete at the AIBA World Championships. Pampellone reached the quarter finals before losing to England's Benjamin Whittaker. Despite the World Championship lost, he went on to win his second New Zealand national amateur championship that year and was awarded the prestigious Jameson Belt. Pampellone defeated Colton Seymour-Moir in the finals. Pampellone was selected to be part of the New Zealand Boxing Team. He would attempt to qualify for the olympics at the 2020 Asia & Oceania Boxing Olympic Qualification Tournament. The team had been training in Thailand and Italy. There was fear that the event would be canceled with the COVID-19 pandemic. Pampellone won his first fight in the tournament against Japan boxer Ren Umemura. Pampellone lost against Bekzad Nurdauletov of Kazakhstan, ending his olympic hopes. Pampellone competed in his last national championships at the Boxing New Zealand 2020 National Championships. The tournament was postponed to January 2021 due to the covid pandemic. Pampellone won the championship against Jeshaiah Perelina.

== Professional career ==
=== Early career (2020–2021) ===
Pampellone was successful in his first two professional fights against Thomas Russell on Sky TV and Mandela Ale in 2020. Pampellone had his television return when he fought Antz Amouta on the Joseph Parker vs. Junior Fa undercard in February 2021. Pampellone won by knockout. Pampellone would fight Thomas Russell in a rematch. Pampellone would win by second-round stoppage. He would return quickly to the with a win over Paane Haraki. Pampellone fought Joshua Tai twice, winning on both occasions. First in May and the second on Sky TV in July. After the fight against Joshua Tai, it was announced that Pampellone would fight John Parker for an NZ title. The fight would happen at the ASB Tennis Centre which would be the first time that boxing would be held at the venue. It was announced the fight was scheduled in February 2022. Due to New Zealand going into Lockdown from COVID-19, the event did not end up happening.

=== International fights (2022) ===
Pampellone would make his International professional debut when he took on Lucas Miller in Australia. It was announced that Pampellone signed a long-term deal with promoter Dean Lonergan. Pampellone won the fight by unanimous decision. After the fight, it was announced that Pampellone would take on Nikolas Charalampous in the cruiserweight division. Pampellone who is normally a Light Heavyweight, went up in weight for this fight. Pampellone won the fight by unanimous decision, however, rival John Parker lost on the card, making it less likely for a future fight. In June 2020, it was announced that Pampellone would take on Joshua Francis who is trained by Shane Cameron. A couple of weeks before the fight, promoter Dean Lonergan stated that he was working with IBF to get a regional title on the fight. It is believed that the winner would set themselves up for a world title fight against Jai Opetaia for the IBF and The Ring World cruiserweight titles. At the event, it was announced that the fight would be for both the IBF Regional title and New Zealand National Cruiserweight title. Pampellone won the fight by sixth round stoppage. In October 2022, Pampellone took on Thailand boxer Thoedsak Sinam. The Thailand boxer put up a very disappointing performance against Pampellone. Pampellone won the fight by Knockout in 80 seconds in the first round by a body shot. A couple of weeks later, Pampellone took on French born Australian Faris Chevalier for the vacant IBF Australasian Light Heavyweight title. Pampellone won the fight by unanimous decision, winning almost every round. Pampellone acknowledged his opponent saying it was a hard fight. With this victory, Pampellone is the first boxer to hold the IBF Australasian title in two weight divisions at the same time.

=== World Ranked (2023) ===
In January 2023, Pampellone receive his first world ranking, being ranked 14th in the Light Heavyweight division with the IBF. In April 2023, Pampellone took on former sparring partner, Mose Auimatagi Jnr. Pampellone would win the fight by first round Knockout winning the WBO Asia Pacific and successfully defending the IBF Australasian titles. Pampellone would take on undefeated South African, Luvuyo Sizani. For the second time in a row, Pampellone would stop his opponent in the first round, winning the IBF Intercontinental title. After this victory, Pampellone was ranked 7th in IBF, 11th in WBO, and 14th in WBC. At the beginning of December Pampellone will take on Rogelio Medina. Pampellone won the fight by first-round TKO, with this being the third fight in a row with the same outcome.

=== No Limit Boxing (2024) ===
In February 2024, Pampellone and Peach Boxing announced their departure with Dean Lonergan D&L Events and had signed with No Limit Boxing under Matt and George Rose. In April 2024, Pampellone's first fight under No Limit Boxing, he took on Libyan boxer Malik Zinad in a World title eliminator with the winner to fight either Artur Beterbiev or Dmitrii Bivol in the future. Unfortunately, Pampellone suffered the first loss of his career by losing the fight by majority decision which was considered an upset. Pampellone would get another opportunity for a world title when he fought Northern Ireland born Australian Conor Wallace in August 2024. Unfortunately Pampellone would lose his second fight in a row by Split Decision. Unfortunately Pampellone's contract expired with No Limit Boxing at the beginning of 2025.

=== Interim World title challenger (2025) ===
In February 2025, Pampellone would return by defeated Thailand boxer Plaisakda Boonmalert by first-round TKO in Singmanassak Muaythai School, Pathum Thani, Thailand. This would set him up for a fight against Venezuelan boxer Albert Ramirez for the vacant interim WBA world Light Heavyweight title in August 2025. Unfortunately Pampellone suffered the first stoppage loss of his professional boxing career when he loss by TKO in the seventh round.

== Boxing titles ==
=== Amateur ===
- New Zealand National Amateur Boxing Championship
  - 2018 New Zealand Light Heavyweight Champion
  - 2019 New Zealand Light Heavyweight Champion
  - 2019 Jameson Belt Most Scientific Senior Male Boxer
  - 2020 New Zealand Light Heavyweight Champion
- Central North Island Championships
  - 2020 Regional Champion
- North Island Golden Gloves Championships
  - 2019 North Island Champion

=== Professional ===
- Professional Boxing Commission New Zealand
  - New Zealand National Cruiserweight Champion
- International Boxing Federation
  - IBF Australasian Cruiserweight Champion
  - IBF Australasian Light Heavyweight Champion
  - IBF Inter-Continental Light Heavyweight Champion
- World Boxing Organisation
  - WBO Asia Pacific Light Heavyweight Champion

== Professional boxing record ==
22 fights	19 wins	3 losses
By knockout	12	1
By decision	7	2

No.	Result	Record	Opponent	Type	Round, time	Date	Location	Notes
22	Loss	19–3	Albert Ramírez	TKO	7 (12), 1:19	8 Aug 2025	Benina Martyrs Stadium, Benghazi, Libya	For vacant Interim WBA World Light Heavyweight title
21	Win	19–2	Plaisakda Boonmalert	TKO	1 (6), 0:53	8 Feb 2025	Singmanassak Muaythai School, Pathum Thani, Thailand	
20	Loss	18–2	Conor Wallace	SD	12	28 Aug 2024	International Convention Centre Sydney, Sydney, Australia	For vacant WBO Inter-Continental light heavyweight title and IBF World title Eliminator for #2 spot
19	Loss	18–1	Malik Zinad	MD	12	24 Apr 2024	Hordern Pavilion, Sydney, Australia	For IBF World title Eliminator for #2 spot
18	Win	18–0	Rogelio Medina	TKO	1 (10)	2 Dec 2023	McKay Stadium, Whangārei, New Zealand	
17	Win	17–0	Luvuyo Sizani	TKO	1 (10), 1:01	26 Aug 2023	Eventfinda Stadium, Auckland, New Zealand	Won vacant IBF Inter-Continental light heavyweight title
16	Win	16–0	Mose Auimatagi Jr.	TKO	1 (10), 1:14	27 Apr 2023	Eventfinda Stadium, Auckland, New Zealand	Retained IBF Australasian light heavyweight title; Won vacant WBO Asia Pacific light heavyweight title
15	Win	15–0	Faris Chevalier	UD	10	4 Nov 2022	Nissan Arena, Brisbane, Australia	Won vacant IBF Australasian light heavyweight title
14	Win	14–0	Thoedsak Sinam	KO	1 (6), 1:19	21 Oct 2022	ABA Stadium, Auckland, New Zealand	
13	Win	13–0	Joshua Francis	TKO	6 (10), 2:38	21 Jul 2022	Eventfinda Stadium, Auckland, New Zealand	Won vacant IBF Australasian and PBCNZ cruiserweight titles
12	Win	12–0	Nikolas Charalampous	UD	6	20 May 2022	War Memorial Museum, Auckland, New Zealand	
11	Win	11–0	Lucas Miller	UD	10	13 Apr 2022	Fortitude Music Hall, Brisbane, Australia	
10	Win	10–0	Richie Feulufai	KO	3 (4)	11 Dec 2021	ABA Stadium, Auckland, New Zealand	
9	Win	9–0	Jason Tuala	TKO	1 (4)	11 Dec 2021	ABA Stadium, Auckland, New Zealand	
8	Win	8–0	Joshua Tai	UD	6	23 Jul 2021	SkyCity Theatre, Auckland, New Zealand	
7	Win	7–0	Joshua Tai	UD	6	8 May 2021	ABA Stadium, Auckland, New Zealand	
6	Win	6–0	Jason Tuala	KO	2 (4), 0:25	17 Apr 2021	Sir Don Rowlands Centre, Cambridge, New Zealand	
5	Win	5–0	Pane Haraki	UD	4	9 Apr 2021	SkyCity Theatre, Auckland, New Zealand	
4	Win	4–0	Thomas Russell	TKO	2 (4), 2:41	26 Mar 2021	Takapuna Rugby Football Club, Auckland, New Zealand	
3	Win	3–0	Anthony Amouta	KO	1 (4), 2:57	27 Feb 2021	Spark Arena, Auckland, New Zealand	
2	Win	2–0	Mandela Ale	RTD	3 (4), 3:00	13 Feb 2021	ABA Stadium, Auckland, New Zealand	
1	Win	1–0	Thomas Russell	UD	4	19 Dec 2020	ABA Stadium, Auckland, New Zealand	

== Awards ==
- New Zealand Boxing Awards
  - 2019 Amateur Boxer of the year (Nominated)
  - 2020 Male Amateur Boxer of the year (Won)
  - 2021 Boxer of the year (Won)
  - 2021 Male Boxer of the year (Won)
  - 2022 Male Boxer of the year (Won)
