= Gunnar Jackson =

New Zealand boxer

Personal information
- Nickname: The Stunna
- Nationality: New Zealand
- Born: 6 July 1986 (age 40) Wellington, New Zealand
- Height: 5 ft 9 1/2 in (177 cm)
- Weight: Light middleweight; Middleweight; Super middleweight; Light heavyweight

Boxing career
- Reach: 69 in (175 cm)
- Stance: Orthodox

Boxing record
- Total fights: 46
- Wins: 29
- Win by KO: 12
- Losses: 13
- Draws: 4

Gunnar Jackson (born 6 July 1986) is a New Zealand professional boxer. At regional level he held the NZPBA super middleweight title from 2012 to 2013; the NZPBA middleweight title in 2013; and the WBO Oriental middleweight title twice between 2013 and 2015.

== Professional career ==
Jackson fought the biggest fight of his career in January 2014 against four-time world champion Anthony Mundine. Jackson lost by unanimous points decision.

Jackson fought Kerry Hope in June 2015. Hope was originally scheduled to fight Michael Zerafa for the Interim WBO Oriental Middleweight title, but Zerafa pulled out days before the fight. Jackson took the fight on only a few days notice, defending his WBO Oriental Middleweight Title. Jackson again lost by unanimous points decision.

== Professional boxing record ==
| 46 fights | 29 wins | 13 losses |
|---|---|---|
| By knockout | 12 | 0 |
| By decision | 17 | 13 |
| Draws | 4 | |

| Res. | Record | Opponent | Type | Rd., Time | Date | Location | Notes |
|---|---|---|---|---|---|---|---|
| Lose | 29-13-4 | (New Zealand) Andrei Mikhailovich | UD | 10 | 2019-08-03 | (New Zealand) Sir Don Rowlands Centre, Lake Karapiro, Cambridge | vacant Pro Box NZ Middleweight title. Jackson announced his retirement. |
| Win | 29-12-4 | (New Zealand) Marcus Heywood | UD | 5 | 2019-02-23 | (New Zealand) Sportscave, Stanmore Bay | |
| Win | 28-12-4 | (New Zealand) Blake Bell | UD | 10 | 2018-11-24 | Tauranga, New Zealand | vacant NZPBA Central & vacant Pro Box NZ Middleweight Titles |
| Lose | 27-12-4 | (New Zealand) Beau O'Brien | MD | 10 | 2018-10-06 | Pettigrew Green Arena, Napier, New Zealand | vacant NZPBA & vacant UBF Asia Pacific Middleweight Titles |
| Lose | 27-11-4 | (Australia) David Toussaint | UD | 10 | 2018-05-04 | Hellenic Club, Australia Central | vacant Australasian Middleweight Title |
| Win | 27-10-4 | (New Zealand) James Uoka | TKO | 2 (4) | 2018-03-29 | Shed 10, Auckland, New Zealand | |
| Draw | 26-10-4 | (New Zealand) Shay Brock | MD | 8 | 2017-11-03 | ABA Stadium, Auckland, New Zealand | |
| Win | 26-10-3 | (Iraq) Sivan Hermez | UD | 6 | 2017-10-07 | Memorial Hall QE ll, Tauranga, New Zealand | |
| Lose | 25-9-3 | (New Zealand) Bowyn Morgan | UD | 8 | 2016-10-01 | Vodafone Events Centre, Auckland, New Zealand | |
| Win | 25-8-3 | (New Zealand) Kendall Cooper | TKO | 5, (5) 2:28 | 2016-08-13 | Ellerslie Racecourse, Auckland, New Zealand | |
| Lose | 24-8-3 | (New Zealand) Mose Auimatagi Jnr | SD | 10 | 2016-07-01 | ASB Stadium, Auckland, New Zealand | NZPBA & vacant UBF Asia Pacific middleweight titles |
| Win | 24-7-3 | (Australia) Mark Dalby | KO | 2, (8) | 2016-05-14 | Memorial Hall QE ll, Tauranga, New Zealand | |
| Win | 23-7-3 | (New Zealand) Matthew Tuakolo | KO | 1, (6) 2:48 | 2016-03-19 | ABA Stadium, Auckland, New Zealand | |
| Loss | 22-7-3 | (Japan) Ryōta Murata | UD | 10 | 2015-11-07 | Thomas & Mack Center, Las Vegas, United States | |
| Win | 22-6-3 | (New Zealand) Daniel Roy Maxwell | UD | 6 | 2015-10-15 | The Trusts Arena Auckland, New Zealand | |
| Loss | 21-6-3 | (Australia) Kerry Hope | UD | 10 | 2015-06-19 | (New Zealand) Brisbane Convention Centre, South Brisbane Queensland, Australia | WBO Oriental Middleweight Title |
| Win | 21-5-3 | (Australia) Nathan Carroll | MD | 10 | 2015-03-21 | (New Zealand) North Harbour AMI Netball Stadium, Northcote | WBO Oriental Middleweight Title |
| Win | 20-5-3 | (Australia) Kurt Bahram | TKO | 1, (12) 1:25 | 2014-11-29 | YMCA Hamilton City, Hamilton, New Zealand | WBO Oriental Middleweight Title |
| Win | 19-5-3 | (Samoa) Afakasi Faumui | TKO | 5, (12) | 2014-05-22 | Logan Campbell Centre, Auckland, New Zealand | Vacant WBO Oriental Middleweight Title |
| Loss | 18-5-3 | (Australia) Anthony Mundine | UD | 10) | 2014-01-29 | Brisbane Entertainment Centre, Boondall, Queensland, Australia | |
| Win | 18-4-3 | (Fiji) Opeti Tagi | TKO | 2, (12) | 2013-12-13 | Papatoetoe Cosmopolitan Club, Papatoetoe, New Zealand | Vacant WBO Oriental Middleweight Title |
| Win | 17-4-3 | (India) (New Zealand) Venkatesan Harikrishnan | UD | 6 | 2013-11-09 | TGA Stadium, Tauranga, New Zealand | |
| Win | 16-4-3 | (New Zealand) Daniel Roy Maxwell | UD | 10 | 2013-06-28 | Active Zone Indoor Arena, Glenfield, New Zealand | Vacant NZPBA Middlerweight title |
| Loss | 15-4-3 | (New Zealand) Adrian Taihia | UD | 10 | 2013-04-05 | ABA Stadium, Auckland, New Zealand | NZPBA Super Middlerweight Title; Vacant World Boxing Federation Oceania Super Middlerweight Title |
| Win | 15-3-3 | (Samoa) (New Zealand) Moses Ioelu | UD | 6 | 2012-12-08 | TECT Arena, Tauranga, New Zealand | |
| Draw | 14-3-3 | (New Zealand) Adrian Taihia | MD | 10 | 2012-10-27 | ABA Stadium, Auckland, New Zealand | NZPBA Super Middlerweight title |
| Win | 14-3-2 | (Samoa) Faimasasa Tavu'i | UD | 6 | 2012-09-29 | TGA Stadium, Tauranga, New Zealand | |
| Loss | 13-3-2 | (New Zealand) Dimitri Simoukov | SD | 4 | 2012-07-27 | The Corporate Box, Auckland, New Zealand | |
| Win | 13-2-2 | (Australia) David Letizia | TKO | 8, (10) 2:33 | 2012-04-20 | WA Italian Club, Perth, Western Australia | Vacant WBA-PABA Light Heavyweight title |
| Win | 12-2-2 | (Pakistan) (New Zealand) Kashif Mumtaz | UD | 10 | 2012-03-31 | ABA Stadium, Auckland, New Zealand | Vacant NZPBA Super Middlerweight title |
| Win | 11-2-2 | (Samoa) (New Zealand) Peter Tovi'o | TKO | 2, (4) 1:49 | 2012-02-18 | Fighting Fit Gym, Panmure, New Zealand | |
| Win | 10-2-2 | (United Kingdom) (New Zealand) Richard Hackney | UD | 4 | 2011-12-15 | The Corporate Box, Auckland, New Zealand | |
| Win | 9-2-2 | (New Zealand) Fale Siaoloa | UD | 4 | 2011-10-01 | TGA Stadium, Tauranga, New Zealand | |
| Win | 8-2-2 | (New Zealand) Dickey Peirera | UD | 4 | 2011-08-25 | (New Zealand) Takapuna Rugby Football Club, Northcote | |
| Loss | 7-2-2 | (New Zealand) Isaac Peach | UD | 6 | 2011-08-13 | Vodafone Events Centre, Manukau City, New Zealand | |
| Win | 7-1-2 | (Samoa) (New Zealand) Niusila Seiuli | UD | 4 | 2011-06-05 | The Trusts Arena, Auckland, New Zealand | |
| Win | 6-1-2 | (Samoa) (New Zealand) Moses Ioelu | UD | 4 | 2011-05-28 | ABA Stadium, Auckland, New Zealand | |
| Win | 5-1-2 | (New Zealand) Dickey Peirera | TKO | 3, (4) | 2011-05-14 | TGA Stadium, Tauranga, New Zealand | |
| Win | 4-1-2 | (New Zealand) James Uoka | TKO | 1, (6) 2:12 | 2011-04-02 | ABA Stadium, Auckland, New Zealand | |
| Draw | 3-1-2 | (Samoa) Afakasi Faumui | MD | 4 | 2011-03-19 | Vodafone Events Centre, Manukau City, New Zealand | |
| Win | 3-1-1 | (New Zealand) Fale Siaoloa | UD | 4 | 2010-12-04 | Headhunters Motorcycle Club, Ellerslie, New Zealand | |
| Win | 2-1-1 | (Samoa) (New Zealand) Niusila Seiuli | UD | 4 | 2010-11-27 | TGA Stadium, Tauranga, New Zealand | |
| Draw | 1–1-1 | (Australia) David Letizia | MD | 6 | 2010-10-09 | (New Zealand) Arena Joondalup, Joondalup, Western Australia | |
| Win | 1–1 | (New Zealand) Ryan O'Connell | TKO | 4,(4) 1:27 | 2010-08-28 | Howick Recreation Centre, Pakuranga, New Zealand | |
| Loss | 0–1 | (New Zealand) Joshua Tai | MD | 4 (4) | 2010-05-24 | Queen Elizabeth Youth Centre, Tauranga, New Zealand | |

== Titles ==
Sporting positions
Regional boxing titles
| Vacant Title last held by Norm Graham vacated | NZPBA super middleweight title 31 March 2012 – 4 April 2013 | Succeeded by Adrian Taihia |
| Vacant Title last held by Manny Vlamis vacated | PABA light heavyweight title 20 April 2012 - 15 March 2013 | Vacant |
| Vacant Title last held by Norm Graham stripped | NZPBA middleweight title 28 June 2013 - 1 July 2016 | Succeeded by Mose Auimatagi Jnr |
| Preceded by Steve Heremaia | WBO Oriental middleweight title 13 December 2013 - 19 June 2015 | Succeeded by Kerry Hope |

== Awards and recognitions ==
- 2019 Gladrap Boxing Awards New Zealand fight of the year (Nominated)
