= Shannan Taylor =

Australian boxer

Personal information
- Nickname: The Bulli Blaster
- Nationality: Australian
- Born: 12 May 1972 (age 54) Bulli, Wollongong, New South Wales
- Height: 1.78 m (5 ft 10 in)

Boxing career
- Reach: 1.78 m (5 ft 10 in)
- Stance: Orthodox

Boxing record
- Total fights: 65
- Wins: 52
- Win by KO: 37
- Losses: 10
- Draws: 3

Shannan Taylor (born 12 May 1972) is an Australian former professional boxer.

Shannan was trained from his teens in boxing. His training mainly took place at the Bulli PCYC in the boxing room, on the second floor of the building.

In October 2011, he defeated Thailand's Sintung Kietbusaba in his home town of Wollongong to claim the vacant Middleweight world championship of the lightly regarded World Boxing Foundation (WBF). Anthony Mundine had taken the title from him in 2009.

Taylor's best-known fight was a 2001 bout against "Sugar" Shane Mosley in Las Vegas on 10 March 2001, for the WBC welterweight title, although Mosley won, retaining the title.

On 28 November 2011, Taylor was admitted to hospital in Wollongong in a critical condition after a heroin overdose. He regained consciousness after a week in an induced coma.

== Professional boxing record ==
65 fights	52 wins	10 losses
By knockout	37	6
By decision	14	4
By disqualification	1	0
Draws	3	

No.	Result	Record	Opponent	Type	Round, time	Date	Location	More
65	Win	52–10–3	(Thailand) Sintung Kietbusaba	KO	4 (12), 1:14	7 Oct 2011	Beaton Park Stadium, Wollongong, Australia	Won vacant IBF Pan Pacific and vacant WBF middleweight titles
64	Loss	51–10–3	(Australia) Serge Yannick	SD	12	13 May 2011	The Melbourne Pavilion, Flemington, Australia	For vacant WBA Pan African and vacant PABA super middleweight titles
63	Win	51–9–3	(Australia) Tim Kanofski	UD	12	26 Mar 2011	Croatian Club, Punchbowl, Australia	Retained IBF Pan Pacific super middleweight title
62	Loss	50–9–3	(Australia) Junior Talipeau	UD	8	31 Oct 2010	State Sports Centre, Sydney, Australia	
61	Win	50–8–3	(Australia) Ben Costello	TKO	1 (8), 1:34	2 Jun 2010	Wollongong Entertainment Centre, Wollongong, Australia	
60	Loss	49–8–3	(Australia) Les Sherrington	TKO	5 (12), 2:28	27 Nov 2009	Gold Coast Convention Centre, Broadbeach, Australia	For PABA and interim WBF super middleweight titles
59	Win	49–7–3	(Thailand) Athit Praditphon	KO	1 (12), 1:07	29 May 2009	Beaton Park Stadium, Wollongong, Australia	Won vacant IBF Pan Pacific super middleweight title
58	Loss	48–7–3	(Australia) Anthony Mundine	UD	12	11 Feb 2009	Wollongong Entertainment Centre, Wollongong, Australia	For vacant WBA International middleweight title
57	Win	48–6–3	(Philippines) Dondon Sultan	TKO	12 (12), 2:48	31 Oct 2008	Shoalhaven Entertainment Centre, Shoalhaven Heads, Australia	Retained PABA middleweight title
56	Win	47–6–3	(Thailand) Thongtip Posri	KO	3 (12), 1:23	11 Jul 2008	Shoalhaven Sports & Social Club, Shoalhaven Heads, Australia	Won vacant IBF Australasian super middleweight title
55	Win	46–6–3	(Indonesia) Andreas Seran	KO	8 (12), 2:59	6 Jun 2008	Gold Coast Convention Centre, Broadbeach, Australia	Won vacant PABA middleweight title
54	Draw	45–6–3	(Australia) Sonni Michael Angelo	TD	1 (12), 1:57	14 Sep 2007	Cronulla-Sutherland Leagues Club, Cronulla, Australia	For vacant WBF middleweight title; Taylor cut by an accidental head clash
53	Win	45–6–2	(Thailand) Kiattisak Kuarwan	KO	6 (10), 1:30	26 Jul 2007	The Amphitheatre, Darwin, Australia	
52	Win	44–6–2	(Thailand) Dechapon Suwunnalird	TKO	4 (12), 1:34	17 Mar 2007	Bolton Park Sports Stadium, Wagga Wagga, Australia	Won vacant IBF Australasian super welterweight title
51	Win	43–6–2	(Philippines) Nonoy Gonzales	RTD	6 (12), 3:00	15 Dec 2006	Fraternity Bowling Club, Fairy Meadow, Australia	Won vacant IBF Australasian middleweight title
50	Loss	42–6–2	(Canada) Ian MacKillop	TKO	6 (12), 1:41	21 Jul 2006	Wollongong Entertainment Centre, Wollongong, Australia	For vacant IBF Australasian and IBO Inter-Continental super welterweight titles
49	Loss	42–5–2	(Germany) Arthur Abraham	UD	12	4 Mar 2006	Large EWE Arena, Oldenburg, Germany	For IBF middleweight title
48	Loss	42–4–2	(Netherlands) Raymond Joval	TKO	10 (12), 2:04	27 Nov 2005	Vodafone Arena, Melbourne, Australia	For IBO middleweight title
47	Win	42–3–2	(Argentina) Sergio Ernesto Acuna	TKO	7 (10)	1 Jul 2005	Panthers World of Entertainment, Penrith, Australia	
46	Win	41–3–2	(Uruguay) Ruben Silva Diaz	TKO	3 (12), 1:32	23 Feb 2005	Vodafone Arena, Melbourne, Australia	Retained IBF Pan Pacific super welterweight title
45	Win	40–3–2	(Thailand) Plaisakda Boonmalert	KO	2 (12), 1:43	17 Dec 2004	Royal Pines Resort, Ashmore, Australia	Won vacant WBF super middleweight title
44	Win	39–3–2	(Argentina) Sergio Ernesto Acuna	TKO	8 (12), 1:10	24 Sep 2004	Panthers World of Entertainment, Penrith, Australia	Retained IBF Pan Pacific super welterweight title
43	Win	38–3–2	(Argentina) Walter Crucce	UD	12	25 Jun 2004	Royal Pines Resort, Ashmore, Australia	Retained IBF Pan Pacific super welterweight title
42	Win	37–3–2	(Argentina) Paulo Alejandro Sanchez	UD	12	7 Mar 2004	Panthers World of Entertainment, Penrith, Australia	Retained IBF Pan Pacific super welterweight title
41	Win	36–3–2	(Australia) Ian McLeod	RTD	5 (12), 3:00	5 Dec 2003	Panthers World of Entertainment, Penrith, Australia	Won IBF Pan Pacific super welterweight title
40	Win	35–3–2	(Argentina) Oscar Daniel Veliz	UD	12	31 Oct 2003	Panthers World of Entertainment, Penrith, Australia	Retained PABA super welterweight title
39	Win	34–3–2	(Argentina) Marcelo Alejandro Rodriguez	TKO	11 (12)	19 Sep 2003	Panthers World of Entertainment, Penrith, Australia	Retained Australian super middleweight title; Won vacant WBA Fedelatin and vacant PABA super welterweight titles
38	Win	33–3–2	(Indonesia) Sikat Pasaribu	KO	2 (10)	22 Aug 2003	Club Nova, Newcastle, Australia	
37	Win	32–3–2	(Australia) Marc Bargero	SD	12	11 Apr 2003	Panthers World of Entertainment, Penrith, Australia	Won Australian super middleweight title
36	Draw	31–3–2	(Australia) Marc Bargero	TD	6 (12)	21 Feb 2003	Panthers World of Entertainment, Penrith, Australia	For Australian super middleweight title; Taylor cut from an accidental head clash
35	Win	31–3–1	(Fiji) Mamurat Ali	KO	1 (12)	9 Oct 2002	Panthers Rugby League Club, Penrith, Australia	Retained PABA super welterweight title
34	Win	30–3–1	(Indonesia) Harmen Ajadato	TKO	9 (12)	19 Jul 2002	Southport RSL Club, Southport, Australia	Won PABA super welterweight title
33	Loss	29–3–1	(United Kingdom) Richard Williams	TKO	4 (12), 2:17	1 Dec 2001	(United Kingdom) York Hall, London, England	For Commonwealth and vacant IBO super welterweight titles
32	Loss	29–2–1	(Australia) Julian Holland	TKO	7 (12), 1:19	17 Aug 2001	The Octagon, Sydney, Australia	For vacant WBO Asia Pacific, vacant Commonwealth, and Australian welterweight titles
31	Win	29–1–1	(Philippines) Bert Bado	KO	1 (10)	13 Jul 2001	The Octagon, Sydney, Australia	
30	Loss	28–1–1	(United States) Shane Mosley	RTD	6 (12), 3:00	10 Mar 2001	(United States) Caesars Palace, Las Vegas, Nevada, U.S.	For WBC welterweight title
29	Win	28–0–1	(Canada) Nick Rupa	TKO	8 (10)	25 Aug 2000	Wollongong Entertainment Centre, Wollongong, Australia	
28	Win	27–0–1	(Cayman Islands) Charles Whittaker	UD	10	17 Jun 2000	(United States) Staples Center, Los Angeles, California, U.S.	
27	Win	26–0–1	(New Zealand) Sean Sullivan	PTS	10	15 Apr 2000	Wollongong Basketball Stadium, Wollongong, Australia	
26	Win	25–0–1	(United Kingdom) Gary Murray	KO	4 (10)	11 Feb 2000	Beaton Park Stadium, Wollongong, Australia	
25	Win	24–0–1	(United States) Lonny Beasley	KO	3 (10)	9 Jul 1999	Wollongong, Australia	
24	Win	23–0–1	(Argentina) Walter Fabian Saporiti	TKO	1 (10)	16 Apr 1999	Wollongong Entertainment Centre, Wollongong, Australia	
23	Win	22–0–1	(South Korea) Suk Hyun Yoon	TD	6 (12)	25 Sep 1998	Wollongong Entertainment Centre, Wollongong, Australia	Won OBFP welterweight title
22	Win	21–0–1	(Mexico) Jose Luis Benitez	UD	10	21 May 1998	Beaton Park Stadium, Wollongong, Australia	
21	Win	20–0–1	(Puerto Rico) Antonio Rivera	KO	1 (10), 2:15	27 Feb 1998	Beaton Park Stadium, Wollongong, Australia	
20	Win	19–0–1	(Argentina) Carlos Alberto Malaga	KO	3 (10), 2:59	7 Nov 1997	Thirroul Rugby League Club, Thirroul, Australia	
19	Win	18–0–1	(Russia) Viktor Baranov	UD	10	18 Jul 1997	Thirroul Rugby League Club, Thirroul, Australia	
18	Win	17–0–1	(New Zealand) Sean Sullivan	PTS	10	4 Apr 1997	Beaton Park Stadium, Wollongong, Australia	
17	Win	16–0–1	(Puerto Rico) Jake Rodríguez	KO	3 (10)	21 Dec 1996	Wollongong, Australia	
16	Win	15–0–1	(United States) Theodore Carradine	KO	1 (10), 2:10	30 Jul 1996	Shellharbour Workers Club, Shellharbour, Australia	
15	Draw	14–0–1	(United States) Corey Johnson	PTS	10	30 Mar 1996	(Republic of Ireland) Point Theatre, Dublin, Ireland	
14	Win	14–0	(Saint Kitts and Nevis) Livingstone Bramble	KO	1 (10), 0:55	27 Nov 1995	Toowoomba Showgrounds, Toowoomba, Australia	
13	Win	13–0	(United States) Willy Wise	TKO	2 (10)	25 Sep 1995	Dapto Rugby League Club, Dapto, Australia	
12	Win	12–0	(United States) Dwayne Swift	KO	3 (10)	31 Jul 1995	Twin Towns Services Club, Tweed Heads, Australia	
11	Win	11–0	(United States) Buck Smith	TD	6 (10)	29 May 1995	Parramatta Rugby League Club, Sydney, Australia	Cut eye stoppage
10	Win	10–0	(Fiji) Ilaitia Vaka	TKO	4 (10)	2 Dec 1994	ANZ National Stadium, Suva, Fiji	
9	Win	9–0	(New Zealand) Alberto MaChong	KO	3 (10)	19 Oct 1994	Dapto Rugby League Club, Dapto, Australia	
8	Win	8–0	(New Zealand) Monty Bhana	TKO	2 (10), 2:17	9 Jul 1994	Dapto Rugby League Club, Dapto, Australia	
7	Win	7–0	(Fiji) Pita Tabuarua	KO	1 (10)	16 Mar 1994	Dapto Rugby League Club, Dapto, Australia	
6	Win	6–0	(Philippines) Bert Navarez	PTS	10	22 Jan 1994	Dapto Rugby League Club, Dapto, Australia	
5	Win	5–0	(United States) Luis Maysonet	UD	10	26 Nov 1993	Newcastle Entertainment Centre, Newcastle, Australia	
4	Win	4–0	(Australia) Larry Sarmiento	DQ	2 (10)	11 Sep 1993	Dapto Rugby League Club, Dapto, Australia	
3	Win	3–0	(Australia) Shane Riley	KO	10 (12), 2:04	12 Feb 1993	Burswood Superdome, Perth, Australia	Won Australian super lightweight title
2	Win	2–0	(Australia) Brian Williams	TKO	8 (10), 1:17	13 Nov 1992	Festival Hall, Melbourne, Australia	
1	Win	1–0	(Australia) Darrell Hiles	TKO	2 (10)	10 Jul 1992	Beaton Park Stadium, Wollongong, Australia	
