= Sean Sullivan (boxer) =

New Zealand boxer (born 1968)

Personal information
- Nationality: New Zealand
- Born: 28 December 1968 (age 57) Ōtara, New Zealand
- Weight: Welterweight; Super Welterweight; Middleweight; Super Middleweight; Light Heavyweight; Cruiserweight

Boxing career

Boxing record
- Total fights: 74
- Wins: 51
- Win by KO: 22
- Losses: 22
- Draws: 0
- No contests: 1

Sean Sullivan (born 28 December 1968 in Ōtara, Auckland) is a professional boxer from New Zealand. He was ranked as the world's seventh best welterweight by the WBA and the IBF. Sullivan has held national titles in five weight divisions in New Zealand (welterweight, light-middleweight, middleweight, super-middleweight, and light-heavyweight). Sullivan has been inactive since 2008 but has not formally announced his retirement. He was working as a debt-collector as of 2009. In 2009 he was jailed for six months for defrauding Housing New Zealand.

== Professional boxing record ==
74 fights	51 wins	22 losses
By knockout	22	2
By decision	28	20
By disqualification	1	0
Draws	0	
No contests	1	

No.	Result	Record	Opponent	Type	Round, time	Date	Location	Notes
74	Lose	51–22; 1 NC	(New Zealand) Wayne Orbell	UD	3	3 May 2008	Headhunters Motorcycle Club, Ellerslie, New Zealand	
73	Lose	51–21; 1 NC	(New Zealand) Antz Nansen	MD	3	1 Dec 2007	Headhunters Motorcycle Club, Ellerslie, New Zealand	
72	Lose	51–20; 1 NC	(Samoa) Rico Chong Nee	SD	6	11 Nov 2006	Vodafone Events Centre, Manukau City, New Zealand	
71	Lose	51–19; 1 NC	(Algeria) Mohamed Azzaoui	UD	12	27 May 2006	The Centre, Kerikeri, New Zealand	WBA - PABA cruiserweight title
70	Lose	51–18; 1 NC	(New Zealand) Colin Hunia	SD	8	31 Mar 2005	The Trusts Arena, Auckland, New Zealand	
69	Lose	51–17; 1 NC	(Fiji) Sakeasi Dakua	PTS	10	18 Dec 2004	Lawaqa Park, Sigatoka, Fiji	
68	Lose	51–16; 1 NC	(Australia) Anthony Mundine	TKO	10 (10) 0:47	8 Sep 2004	E.G. Whitlam Recreation Center, Liverpool, New South Wales, Australia	
67	Lose	51–15; 1 NC	(Australia) Danny Geen	UD	10	21 Mar 2004	Challenge Stadium, Perth, Western Australia, Australia	
66	Win	51–14; 1 NC	(New Zealand) Daniel Tai	PTS	12	11 Apr 2003	ASB Stadium, Kohimarama, New Zealand	vacant New Zealand National Boxing Federation (NZNBF) light heavyweight title
65	Lose	50–14; 1 NC	(Australia) Anthony Mundine	UD	12	1 Feb 2003	ASB Stadium, Kohimarama, New Zealand	WBA - PABA, Fedelatin & Pan African super middleweight title
64	Win	50–13; 1 NC	(Fiji) Atama Raqili	TKO	4 (8)	7 Dec 2002	YMCA Stadium, Auckland, New Zealand	
63	Win	49–13; 1 NC	(Samoa) Wilhem Schwalger	PTS	8	8 Nov 2002	Town Hall, Wellington, New Zealand	
62	Win	48–13; 1 NC	(New Zealand) Sam Leuii	UD	12	9 Aug 2002	Town Hall, Wellington, New Zealand	vacant New Zealand Boxing Association light heavyweight title
61	Lose	47–13; 1 NC	(Australia) Sam Soliman	UD	12	24 Jul 2002	Powerhouse, Albert Park, Victoria, Australia	vacant IBF Pan Pacific middleweight title
60	Win	47–12; 1 NC	(New Zealand) David O'Neill	TKO	6 (8)	16 May 2002	ABA Stadium, Auckland, New Zealand	
59	Win	46–12; 1 NC	(Australia) Norm Graham	PTS	12	12 Apr 2002	Hamilton Leisure Centre, Waikato, New Zealand	New Zealand Boxing Association super middleweight title
58	Lose	45–12; 1 NC	(Nigeria) Jerry Elliott	UD	12	16 Mar 2002	Bordelandhalle, Magdeburg, Sachsen-Anhalt, Germany	WBC International middleweight title
57	Lose	45–11; 1 NC	(Morocco) Nader Hamdan	UD	8	4 Mar 2002	Jupiters Hotel & Casino, Broadbeach, Queensland, Australia	
56	Win	45–10; 1 NC	(Samoa) Frank Faalenuu	UD	12	29 Nov 2001	ASB Stadium, Kohimarama, New Zealand	New Zealand Boxing Association super middleweight title
55	Win	44–10; 1 NC	(New Zealand) Alan Gibson	PTS	12	21 Oct 2001	Queen Elizabeth Youth Centre, Tauranga, New Zealand	New Zealand Boxing Association middleweight title
54	Win	43–10; 1 NC	(Australia) Glen Fitzpatrick	TKO	4 (6)	24 Apr 2001	Greek Club, Brisbane, Queensland, Australia	
53	Lose	42–10; 1 NC	(United Kingdom) Jawaid Khaliq	PTS	12	27 Nov 2000	Aston Villa Leisure Centre, Birmingham, West Midlands, United Kingdom	vacant Commonwealth (British Empire) welterweight title
52	Lose	42–9; 1 NC	(Australia) Shannan Taylor	PTS	10	15 Apr 2000	Wollongong Basketball Stadium, Wollongong, New South Wales, Australia	
51	Lose	42–8; 1 NC	(United Kingdom) Scott Dixon	PTS	12	5 Feb 2000	York Hall, Bethnal Green, London, United Kingdom	vacant Commonwealth (British Empire) welterweight title
50	Win	42–7; 1 NC	(Samoa) Tauvela Ioane	PTS	12	6 Nov 1999	Downtown Convention Centre, Auckland, New Zealand	New Zealand Boxing Association welterweight title
49	Win	41–7; 1 NC	(Fiji) Pita Tabuarua	DQ	5 (10)	8 Oct 1999	Manurewa Rugby Club, Auckland, New Zealand	
48	Win	40–7; 1 NC	(South Africa) Justice Ganiza	TKO	9 (10)	18 Sep 1999	Downtown Convention Centre, Auckland, New Zealand	
47	Win	39–7; 1 NC	(Australia) Brandon Wood	PTS	10	3 Jul 1999	Downtown Convention Centre, Auckland, New Zealand	
46	Win	38–7; 1 NC	(Australia) Norm Graham	PTS	6	10 Jun 1999	ASB Stadium, Kohimarama, New Zealand	
45	Win	37–7; 1 NC	(New Zealand) Alan Gibson	TKO	7 (12)	6 Mar 1999	Downtown Convention Centre, Auckland, New Zealand	vacant New Zealand Boxing Association super welterweight title
44	Win	36–7; 1 NC	(Fiji) Sovita Tabuarua	KO	2 (12)	7 Nov 1998	Downtown Convention Centre, Auckland, New Zealand	vacant IBF Pan Pacific welterweight title
43	Lose	35–7; 1 NC	(Australia) Julian Holland	SD	12	30 Jul 1998	Southport RSL Club, Southport, Queensland, Australia	vacant Australasian welterweight title
42	Win	35–6; 1 NC	(Australia) Norm Graham	TKO	5 (10)	26 Jun 1998	Te Kauwhata Rugby Club, Auckland, New Zealand	
41	Win	34–6; 1 NC	(Philippines) Dindo Canoy	PTS	12	25 Apr 1998	Downtown Convention Centre, Auckland, New Zealand	
40	Win	33–6; 1 NC	(New Zealand) Alberto MaChong	TKO	7 (12)	21 Feb 1998	Downtown Convention Centre, Auckland, New Zealand	New Zealand Boxing Association welterweight title
39	Win	32–6; 1 NC	(Samoa) Tauvela Ioane	PTS	12	30 Nov 1997	Downtown Convention Centre, Auckland, New Zealand	New Zealand Boxing Association welterweight title
38	Win	31–6; 1 NC	(New Zealand) Sam Aukuso	PTS	5 (12)	19 Oct 1997	Downtown Convention Centre, Auckland, New Zealand	New Zealand Boxing Association welterweight title
37	Lose	30–6; 1 NC	(Australia) Shannan Taylor	PTS	10	4 Apr 1996	Beaton Park Stadium, Wollongong, New South Wales, Australia	
36	Win	30–5; 1 NC	(Fiji) Isikeli Koroi	PTS	10	8 Dec 1996	Downtown Convention Centre, Auckland, New Zealand	
35	Win	29–5; 1 NC	(Australia) Danny 'Boy' Pierce	PTS	10	18 Oct 1996	Downtown Convention Centre, Auckland, New Zealand	
34	Win	28–5; 1 NC	(New Zealand) Misi Swann	TKO	4 (8)	14 Jul 1996	Scarhills Physical Fitness Cen, Papakura, New Zealand	
33	Win	27–5; 1 NC	(Thailand) Rocky Kongaran	KO	8 (8)	28 Apr 1996	Downtown Convention Centre, Auckland, New Zealand	
32	Win	26–5; 1 NC	(United Kingdom) Peter Giles	TKO	8 (10)	3 Dec 1995	Downtown Convention Centre, Auckland, New Zealand	
31	Win	25–5; 1 NC	(Australia) Jeff Malcolm	PTS	10	21 Jul 1995	Town Hall, Auckland, New Zealand	
30	Win	24–5; 1 NC	(New Zealand) Alan Gibson	TKO	5 (12)	7 May 1995	Downtown Convention Centre, Auckland, New Zealand	New Zealand Boxing Association welterweight title
29	Win	23–5; 1 NC	(New Zealand) Alberto MaChong	TKO	10 (12)	9 Dec 1994	ASB Stadium, Kohimarama, New Zealand	New Zealand Boxing Association super welterweight title
28	Win	22–5; 1 NC	(Fiji) Apete Raiwalui	PTS	8	30 Oct 1994	Downtown Convention Centre, Auckland, New Zealand	
27	Win	21–5; 1 NC	(New Zealand) David Warren	PTS	12	16 Jul 1994	Queenstown Night Club, Queenstown, New Zealand	New Zealand Boxing Association welterweight title
26	Win	20–5; 1 NC	(New Zealand) Monty Bhana	PTS	12	31 May 1994	Downtown Convention Centre, Auckland, New Zealand	vacant New Zealand Boxing Association welterweight title
25	Lose	19–5; 1 NC	(United Kingdom) Stefan Scriggins	PTS	8	13 Mar 1994	Brighton, Brisbane, Queensland, Australia	
24	Win	19–4; 1 NC	(New Zealand) Danny Morris	TKO	7 (10)	26 Nov 1993	ASB Stadium, Kohimarama, New Zealand	
23	Win	18–4; 1 NC	(Vanuatu) Phil Kating	PTS	10	10 Oct 1993	National Basketball Stadium, Port Vila, Vanuatu	
22	Win	17–4; 1 NC	(New Zealand) Tony Watson	PTS	10	1 Jul 1993	Auckland, New Zealand	
21	Lose	16–4; 1 NC	(New Zealand) Sililo Figota	TKO	9 (10)	25 Mar 1993	Auckland, New Zealand	
20	Win	16–3; 1 NC	(Samoa) Lui Gasio	TKO	5 (8)	6 Mar 1993	Caroline's Night Club, Wanganui, New Zealand	
19	NC	15–3; 1 NC	(New Zealand) Alberto MaChong	NC	3 (12)	2 Feb 1993	Rosie's Nightclub, Mount Wellington, New Zealand	New Zealand Boxing Association super welterweight title
18	Win	15–3	(New Zealand) Tony Watson	PTS	6	28 Nov 1992	Madgwick Stadium, Wellington, New Zealand	
17	Lose	14–3	(New Zealand) Sililo Figota	PTS	10	21 Nov 1992	Wanganui Showgrounds, Wanganui, New Zealand	Eliminator for New Zealand Light Middleweight Title
16	Win	14–2	(New Zealand) Monty Bhana	KO	3 (8)	3 Nov 1992	Auckland, New Zealand	
15	Win	13–2	(New Zealand) David Warren	PTS	8	22 Oct 1992	War Memorial Stadium, Masterton, New Zealand	
14	Win	12–2	(New Zealand) Mark Stewart	PTS	6	14 Oct 1992	Hamilton Civic Centre, Waikato, New Zealand	
13	Win	11–2	(New Zealand) Owen Lolesio	PTS	6	2 Oct 1992	Lower Hutt Town Hall, Wellington, New Zealand	
12	Win	10–2	(New Zealand) Owen Lolesio	PTS	6	27 Aug 1992	Lower Hutt Town Hall, Wellington, New Zealand	
11	Win	9–2	(New Zealand) Davey Moore	KO	4 (6)	1 Aug 1992	Auckland, New Zealand	
10	Win	8–2	(New Zealand) Malika Rasmussen	KO	4 (6)	17 Jul 1992	Auckland, New Zealand	
9	Win	7–2	(New Zealand) Peter Armstrong	KO	6 (6)	30 Jun 1992	Mandalay Ballroom, Auckland, New Zealand	
8	Win	6–2	(New Zealand) David Warren	PTS	6	26 May 1992	Mandalay Ballroom, Auckland, New Zealand	
7	Win	5–2	(Samoa) Lui Gasio	PTS	8	10 May 1992	Auckland, New Zealand	
6	Win	4–2	(New Zealand) Davey Moore	KO	5 (6)	5 Feb 1992	Auckland, New Zealand	
5	Lose	3–2	(New Zealand) Malika Rasmussen	PTS	6	1 Feb 1992	Auckland, New Zealand	
4	Win	3–1	(New Zealand) Faaititi Fighter Seufale	KO	5 (8)	15 Dec 1991	Lincoln Park Centre, Henderson, New Zealand	
3	Win	2–1	(New Zealand) Brett Vincent	PTS	6	1 Dec 1991	Quinn's Post Hotel, Upper Hutt, New Zealand	
2	Win	1–1	(New Zealand) Davey Moore	PTS	6	1 Nov 1991	Auckland, New Zealand	
1	Lose	0–1	(Samoa) Lui Gasio	PTS	6	29 Sep 1991	Sheraton Hotel, Auckland, New Zealand	Professional debut
