= Daniel Tai =

New Zealand boxer

Daniel Cain Tai
- Born: Daniel Tai; 1 June 1977 (age 49)
- Other names: The Hitman
- Nationality: New Zealander
- Height: 170 cm (5 ft 7 in)
- Weight: 110.4 kg (243 lb; 17 st 5 lb)
- Division: Heavyweight
- Reach: 172 cm (67.7 in)
- Style: Boxing; Kickboxing

Professional boxing record
- Total: 39
- Wins: 23
- By knockout: 6
- Losses: 12
- By knockout: 1
- Draws: 4

Kickboxing record
- Total: 64
- Wins: 51
- By knockout: 18
- Losses: 11
- Draws: 2

Other information
- Notable relatives: Jordan Tai
- Boxing record from BoxRec
- Last updated on: 28 January 2017

Daniel Tai (born 1 June 1977) is a New Zealand professional boxer. He is a two time New Zealand National Boxing Federation (NZNBF) heavyweight title holder, and former ranked 12th in the World Boxing Organization (WBO) Asia Pacific rankings.

Tai currently holds the NZNBF heavyweight title belt.

Tai has challenged for the WBO Asia Pacific title twice in his career, both times against American-New Zealander Chauncy Welliver. Tai has fought a few notable boxers in his career, including Welliver three times, Sam Leuii twice, Danny Green, Sean Sullivan, Jameson Bostic and Bob Gasio.

== Professional boxing titles ==
- NZNBF:
  - New Zealand National heavyweight title (220½ lbs) 2006
  - New Zealand National heavyweight title (235¼ lbs) 2018

== Professional boxing record ==
39 fights	23 wins	12 losses
By knockout	6	1
By decision	17	10
By disqualification	0	1
Draws	4	
No contests	0	

No.	Result	Record	Opponent	Type	Round, time	Date	Location	Notes
39	Lose	23–12–4	(New Zealand) David Light	UD	6	21 July 2018	(New Zealand) ABA Stadium, Auckland	
38	Win	23–11–4	(New Zealand) Conrad Lam	UD	10	29 March 2018	(New Zealand) Shed 10, Auckland	vacant New Zealand National Boxing Federation (NZNBF) heavyweight title
37	Lose	22–11–4	(New Zealand) Hemi Ahio	UD	10	1 September 2017	(New Zealand) AMI Netball Centre, St Johns	vacant PBCNZ & vacant IBO Oceania - Oriental heavyweight title
36	Lose	22–10–4	(New Zealand) Junior Fa	MD	10	18 March 2017	(New Zealand) AMI Netball Centre, St Johns	vacant New Zealand Professional Boxing Association (NZPBA) heavyweight title
35	Win	22–9–4	(New Zealand) Thomas Peato	UD	4	3 December 2016	The Fight Club, Ellerslie, New Zealand	
34	Draw	21–9–4	(New Zealand) Kiki Toa Leutele	MD	4	1 July 2016	ASB Stadium, Kohimarama, New Zealand	
33	Win	21–9–3	(New Zealand) Jayson Aloese	UD	4	28 May 2016	ABA Stadium, Auckland, New Zealand	
32	Draw	20–9–3	(American Samoa) Alapati A'asa	MD	4	21 May 2016	Vodafone Events Centre, Manukau City, New Zealand	
31	Win	20–9–2	(New Zealand) Felise Leniu	UD	4	25 February 2016	ABA Stadium, Auckland, New Zealand	
30	Win	19–9–2	(Samoa) Junior Pati	MD	4	4 December 2010	Headhunters Motorcycle Club, Ellerslie, New Zealand	
29	Lose	18–9–2	(United States) Chauncy Welliver	UD	12	21 August 2010	Panmure Lagoon Stadium, Panmure, New Zealand	interim WBO Asia Pacific & New Zealand National Boxing Federation (NZNBF) heavyweight title
28	Lose	18–8–2	(United States) Chauncy Welliver	UD	12	22 May 2010	Queen Elizabeth Youth Centre, Tauranga, New Zealand	interim WBO Asia Pacific & New Zealand National Boxing Federation (NZNBF) heavyweight title
27	Win	18–7–2	(Samoa) Gogosina Ulutoa	UD	4	1 May 2010	Headhunters Motorcycle Club, Ellerslie, New Zealand	
26	Lose	17–7–2	(United States) Jameson Bostic	UD	4	2 May 2009	Headhunters Motorcycle Club, Ellerslie, New Zealand	
25	Win	17–6–2	(Samoa) Junior Pati	UD	4	11 December 2008	Manurewa Netball Centre, Manurewa, New Zealand	
24	Win	16–6–2	(New Zealand) Joey Wilson	MD	4	6 December 2008	Headhunters Motorcycle Club, Ellerslie, New Zealand	
23	Lose	15–6–2	(Samoa) Bob Gasio	UD	4	8 November 2008	ASB Stadium, Kohimarama, New Zealand	
22	Lose	15–5–2	(United States) Chauncy Welliver	DQ	2 (12) 2:10	16 August 2008	YMCA Stadium, Auckland, New Zealand	New Zealand National Boxing Federation (NZNBF) heavyweight title
21	Win	15–4–2	(Samoa) Seiaute Ma'ilata	TKO	5 (6)	13 May 2008	Leisure Centre, Otara, New Zealand	
20	Lose	14–4–2	(New Zealand) Richard Tutaki	MD	4	5 May 2007	Headhunters Motorcycle Club, Ellerslie, New Zealand	
19	Win	14–3–2	(New Zealand) Elisara Sii Uta	SD	12	11 November 2006	Vodafone Events Centre, Manukau City, New Zealand	New Zealand National Boxing Federation (NZNBF) heavyweight title
18	Win	13–3–2	(New Zealand) Sam Leuii	TKO	2 (12) 0:53	5 June 2006	Manurewa Netball Centre, Manurewa, New Zealand	vacant New Zealand National Boxing Federation (NZNBF) heavyweight title
17	Draw	12–3–2	(Samoa) Amosa Zinck	PTS	4	26 May 2005	ASB Stadium, Kohimarama, New Zealand	
16	Win	12–3–1	(New Zealand) Sam Leuii	PTS	6	24 June 2004	ASB Stadium, Kohimarama, New Zealand	
15	Win	11–3–1	(New Zealand) Elisara Sii Uta	TKO	6 (6)	28 August 2003	ASB Stadium, Kohimarama, New Zealand	
14	Lose	10–3–1	(New Zealand) Sean Sullivan	PTS	12	11 April 2003	ASB Stadium, Kohimarama, New Zealand	vacant New Zealand National Boxing Federation (NZNBF) light heavyweight title
13	Lose	10–2–1	(Australia) Danny Green	TKO	6 (10)	7 December 2001	Wyong RSL Club, Wyong, New South Wales, Australia	
12	Win	10–1–1	(Samoa) Wilhem Schwalger	TKO	2 (6)	25 October 2001	ABA Stadium, Auckland, New Zealand	
11	Win	9–1–1	(Croatia) Ivan Rukavina	PTS	8	24 March 2001	Croatian Cultural Centre, Te Atatū, New Zealand	
10	Win	8–1–1	(New Zealand) Jimmy Fale	PTS	8	14 February 2001	ASB Stadium, Kohimarama, New Zealand	
9	Lose	7–1–1	(New Zealand) Fale Braxton	PTS	4	4 February 2001	ASB Stadium, Kohimarama, New Zealand	
8	Draw	7–0–1	(New Zealand) Gerrard Zohs	PTS	4	13 December 2000	ASB Stadium, Kohimarama, New Zealand	
7	Win	7–0	(New Zealand) David O'Neill	PTS	6	7 December 2000	ASB Stadium, Kohimarama, New Zealand	
6	Win	6–0	(New Zealand) Jimmy Fale	PTS	6	12 October 2000	Rosa Pasifika Night Club, Otara, New Zealand	
5	Win	5–0	(New Zealand) Mika Samoa	TKO	2 (4)	31 August 2000	Rosa Pasifika Night Club, Otara, New Zealand	
4	Win	4–0	(New Zealand) Tuala Taulaga	KO	4 (4)	30 July 2000	Caledonian Hall, Belfast, Christchurch, New Zealand	
3	Win	3–0	(New Zealand) Jake Rasmussen	PTS	4	29 July 2000	Northland Memorial Hall, Dargaville, New Zealand	
2	Win	2–0	(New Zealand) Eni Latu	PTS	4	27 July 2000	Rosa Pasifica Night Club, Otara, New Zealand	
1	Win	1–0	(New Zealand) Thomas Faloa	PTS	6	20 July 2000	ASB Stadium, Kohimarama, New Zealand	Professional debut
