= Mother Helpage =

International Humanitarian Organisation

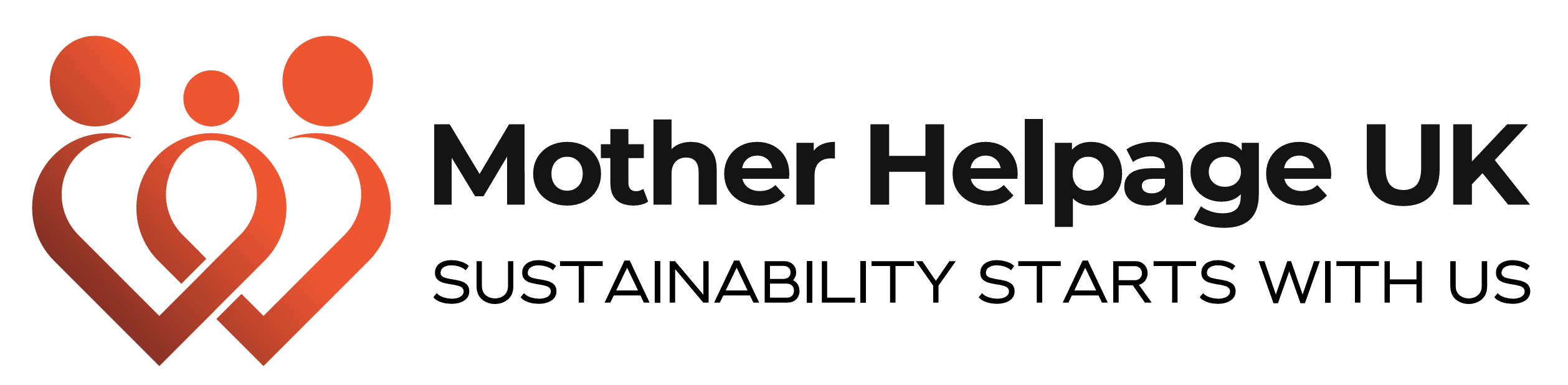
- Abbreviation: MH
- Founded: 1994; 32 years ago
- Founder: Dr Sohail Nasti
- Type: International NGO
- Registration no.: 1148450
- Purpose: List: Emergency; Health; Environmental Protection; Climate Change; Animal Welfare; Development; Seasonal; WASH; Sponsorships; Volunteering
- Headquarters: Derby, UK
- Region served: More than 40 countries
- Services: Humanitarian
- Key people: Chair of Trustees: Syed Lone; CEO: Roshan Ara
- Income: £918,558 (2024)
- Expenses: £814,410 (2024)
- Website: motherhelpage.org

Mother Helpage is a British non-profit international humanitarian organisation based in Derby, England, that has been operating since 1994. It offers assistance in more than 40 countries, focusing on aiding individuals affected by natural disasters, conflict, and poverty. Mother Helpage has been registered with the Charity Commission for England and Wales. Initially it was registered in 2007 with registration number 1119287 and was re-registered in 2012 because of the amendments of its governing documents.

== Vision and mission ==
=== Vision ===
A world where everyone is safe, healthy, and fulfilled.

=== Mission ===
Improving 10 million lives through the provision of sustainable projects in 5 years.

== History ==
Established in 1994, Mother Helpage originated after the death of its founder's mother. In its early years, the foundation operated in India, the ancestral homeland of the family.

== Areas of work ==
- Emergency response: Providing aid to individuals affected by natural disasters, conflicts, and emergencies.
- Health initiatives: Offering healthcare services and support to enhance the well-being of underserved communities.
- Environmental protection: Undertaking efforts to conserve and protect the environment for present and future generations.
- Climate change awareness: Raising awareness about climate change and advocating for sustainable practices.
- Animal welfare: Promoting the welfare of animals and advocating for humane treatment.
- Development: Implementing projects that contribute to socio-economic progress.
- Seasonal campaigns: Running targeted campaigns to address specific needs during particular times.
- Water, sanitation and hygiene (WASH): Ensuring access to clean water, proper sanitation and hygiene education.
- Sponsorship programs: Providing sponsorships to support education, healthcare, and basic necessities for those in need.

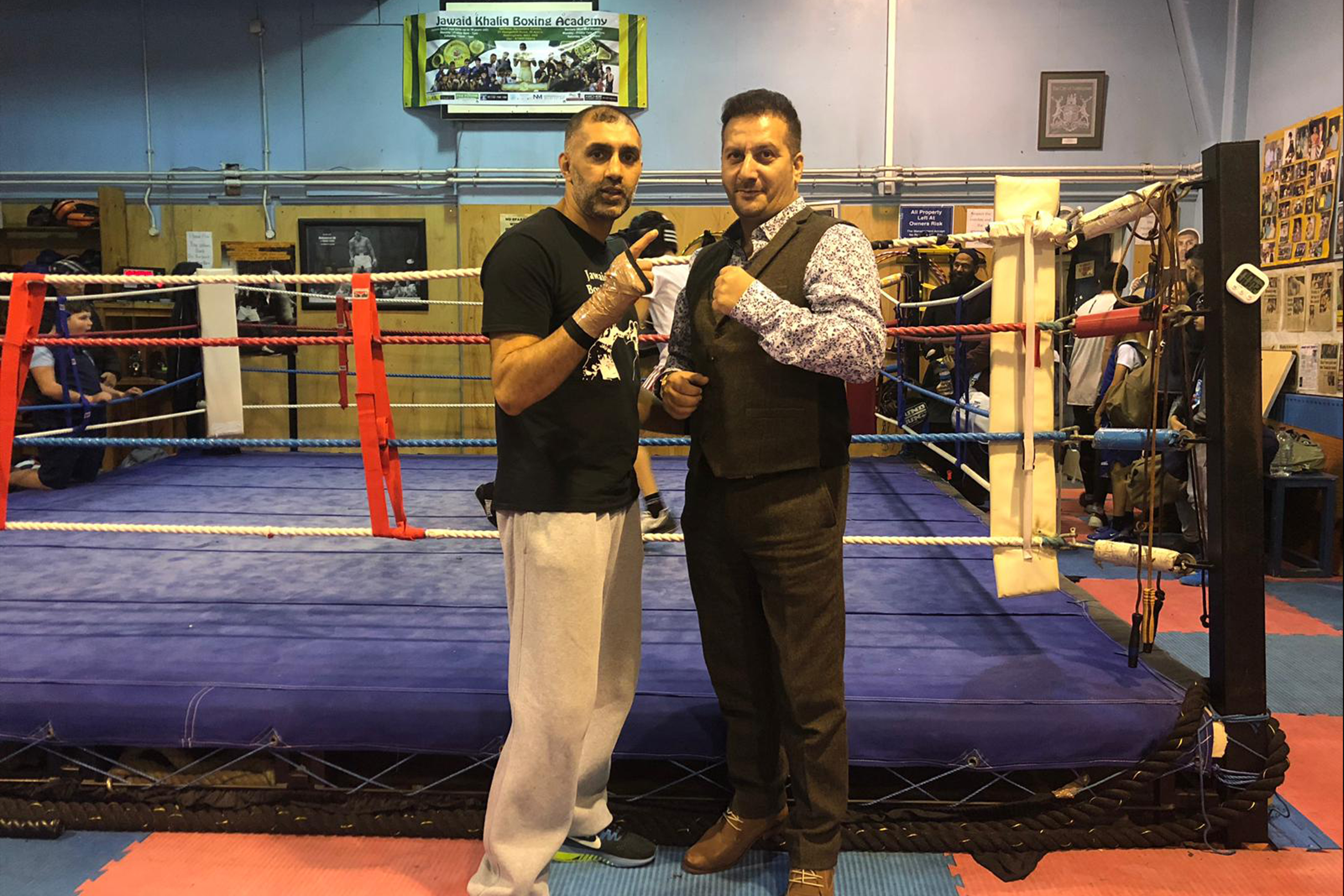
Dr Sohail Nasti (right), Founder Mother Helpage with Jawaid Khaliq MBE (left) at Jawaid Khaliq Boxing Academy, Nottingham.

- Volunteering: Encouraging volunteer participation in humanitarian and community-centered initiatives.
- Income generation: Supporting sustainable livelihood opportunities to help individuals and communities become economically self-reliant through skills training, small business support, and microfinance initiatives.
- Empowerment projects: Running women’s empowerment programs, youth development initiatives, and community workshops aimed at building resilience and enhancing self-sufficiency.
- Drug and knife crime: on December 11, 2018, Mother Helpage, in partnership with Jawaid Khaliq MBE and the Jawaid Khaliq Boxing Academy in Nottingham, launched a campaign aimed at addressing the issues of drug and knife crime among the youth. The primary objective of this initiative is to promote sports and physical activity as a means to engage and inspire young individuals.

== Events ==
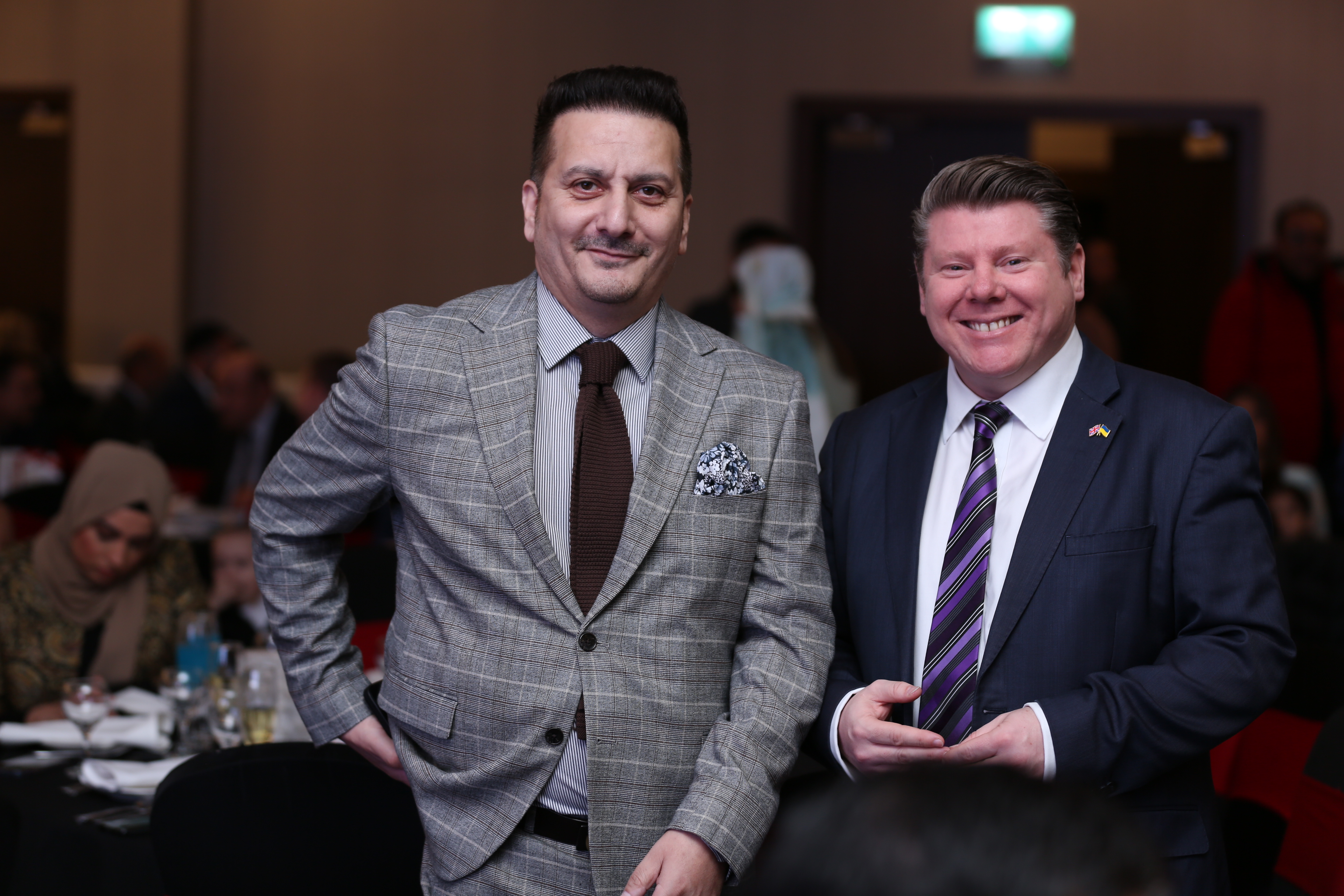
Dr Sohail Nasti (left), Founder of Mother Helpage, with Dean Russell, Member of Parliament (MP) for Watford (right) at the MH Partners Excellence Awards held at the Hilton Hotel, Watford, London.

=== MH Partners Excellence Awards ===
On 12 March 2022, Mother Helpage hosted the inaugural MH Partners Excellence Awards at the Hilton Hotel in Watford, London. The event was organised to recognise and honour charity partners for their contributions to humanitarian efforts and community development within the UK and internationally.

The awards highlighted achievements in areas such as disaster response, poverty alleviation, education, and healthcare. Attendees included representatives of partner organisations, judges, diplomats, and parliamentarians. The keynote address was delivered by Dean Russell, Member of Parliament for Watford.

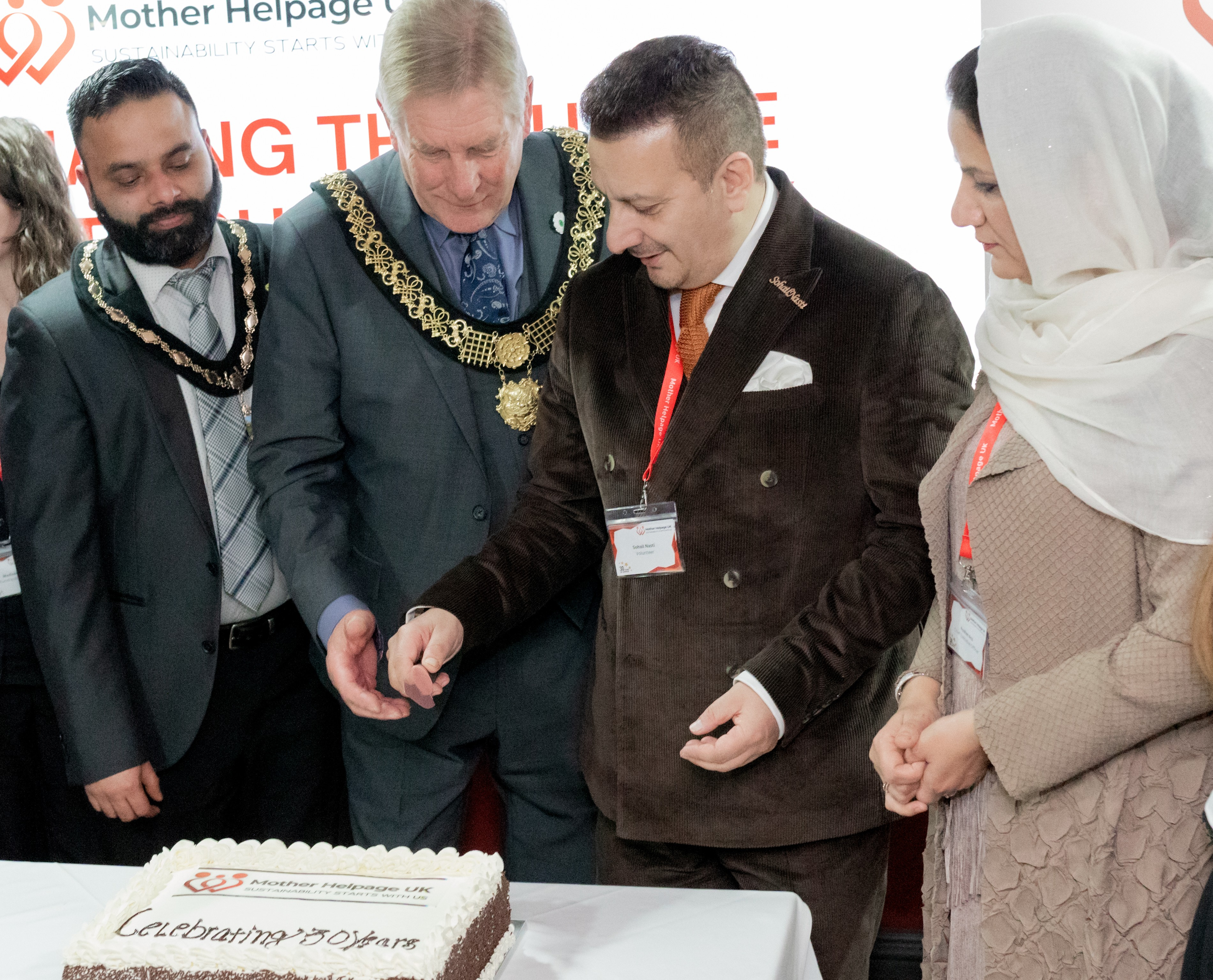
Roshan Ara (CEO), Dr. Sohail Nasti (Founder), Ged Potter (2024–25 Mayor of Derby), and his Consort cutting the cake during the 30th Anniversary of Mother Helpage at the Shaping the Future with Sustainability event.

=== Shaping the Future with Sustainability ===
On 30 January 2025, Mother Helpage organised the Shaping the Future with Sustainability event in Duffield, Derby, bringing together partners, donors, and stakeholders to highlight sustainable development projects aligned with the organisation’s objectives. The event featured speakers, community representatives, and organisations working on sustainability initiatives. Special guests included The Right Worshipful the Mayor of Derby at that time, Ged Potter (2024–25), local councillors, and volunteers.

The event also marked Mother Helpage’s 30th anniversary, which was observed with a symbolic cake-cutting ceremony commemorating three decades of humanitarian work.

== Global Environment Protection Programme ==
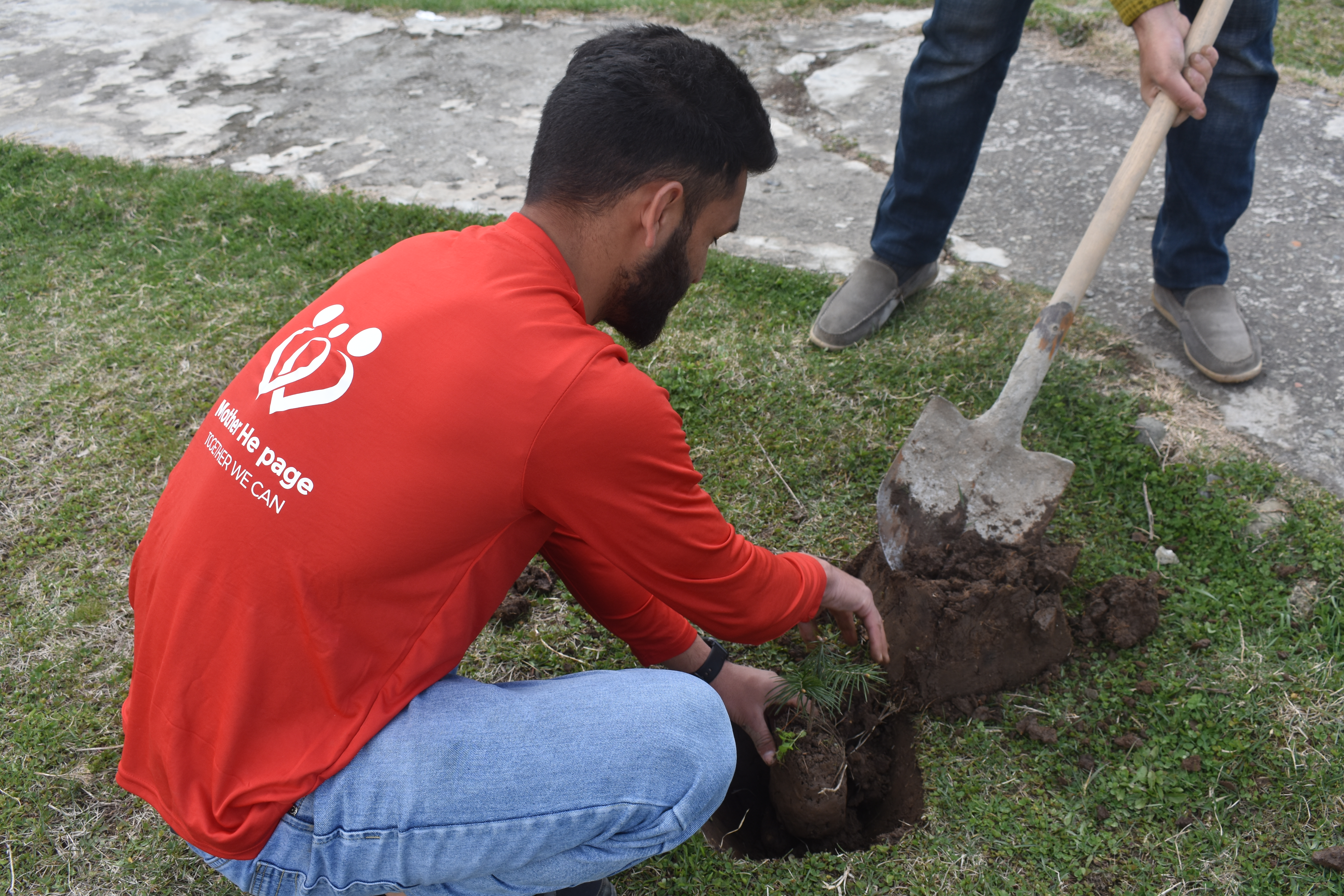
Tree Planting Drive by Mother Helpage at Dandipora Park, Kokernag, J&K, India

The Global Environment Protection Programme, initiated in 2023 by Mother Helpage, aims to advance Sustainable Development Goals, specifically focusing on Climate Action and Life on Land. The programme plans to plant five million trees by 2028. The primary objective is to combat climate change, enhance biodiversity, and promote ecological stability.

== Media coverage and recognition ==
Dr Sohail Nasti, as the founder and prominent face of Mother Helpage, has been widely covered in the media for his humanitarian work and global relief initiatives:

- Nigel Slater (20 June 2023). "The 'true community hero' who helps others all around the globe after disasters". Derbyshire Live.
- (24 December 2024). "Doctor, Pilot, Lifesaver: The Man Who Defied Limits". Greater Kashmir.
- Nazir Ganaie & Dabirah Hassan (15 January 2025). "From Sarnal to the Skies: The Remarkable Journey of Dr Sohail Nasti". Kashmir Observer.

In addition to media coverage, Mother Helpage launched a five-episode podcast series about global peace, financial transparency, sustainable development, local community impact in the UK, and educational empowerment through scholarships and advanced skills training. The series explores the organisation’s mission across more than 40 countries, sharing stories and strategies that promote sustainability, accountability, and resilience. All episodes are available on the Mother Helpage UK YouTube channel.

== See also ==
- Global Hunger Index
- Millennium Development Goals
- Sustainable Development Goals
- Financial Action Task Force
- Fundraising Regulator
- Fraud Advisory Panel
- British Overseas NGOs for Development
- Charity Commission for England and Wales
- International Federation of Red Cross and Red Crescent Societies
- United Nations
- United Nations Department of Global Communications
- World Health Organization
- UNICEF
