= Sam Leuii =

New Zealand boxer

- Born: Sam Leuii; 4 June 1969 (age 57)
- Nationality: New Zealander
- Height: 180 cm (5 ft 11 in)
- Weight: 115.5 kg (255 lb; 18 st 3 lb)
- Division: Heavyweight
- Reach: 175 cm (68.9 in)
- Style: Boxing
- Stance: Orthodox
- Years active: 1997–2014

Professional boxing record
- Total: 40
- Wins: 13
- By knockout: 9
- Losses: 26
- By knockout: 18
- Draws: 1

Other information
- Boxing record from BoxRec
- Last updated on: 28 January 2017

Sam Leuii (born 4 June 1969) is a retired professional boxer from New Zealand. In his career he has held the IBF Pan Pacific Title and has fought for the Commonwealth title. Leuii is also a two time New Zealand professional National Champion and a five time New Zealand Amateur National Champion.

== Professional boxing titles ==
- New Zealand Boxing Association
  - New Zealand National super middleweight title (167¼ lbs)
- International Boxing Federation
  - Pan Pacific super middleweight title (167¼ lbs)
- Oceanic Boxing Association
  - OBA super middleweight title (167 lbs)
- New Zealand National Boxing Federation
  - New Zealand National cruiserweight title (167 lbs)

== Professional boxing record ==
40 fights	13 wins	26 losses
By knockout	9	18
By decision	4	8
Draws	1	

No.	Result	Record	Opponent	Type	Round, time	Date	Location	Notes
40	Lose	13–26–1	(Australia) Joe Lloyd	TKO	2 (4) 2:49	11 October 2014	Celebrity Room, Racing Club, Moonee Valley, Victoria, Australia	
39	Lose	13–25–1	(Australia) Lucas Browne	TKO	1 (4) 2:10	1 July 2010	Panthers Rugby League Club, Penrith, New South Wales, Australia	
38	Lose	13–24–1	(Australia) Ben Edwards	TKO	1 (6) 0:57	23 July 2009	AIS Arena, Bruce, Australian Capital Territory, Australia	
37	Lose	13–23–1	(New Zealand) Nathan Briggs	TKO	1 (6) 2:59	14 March 2008	Kedron Wavell Services Club, Chermside, Queensland, Australia	
36	Lose	13–22–1	(New Zealand) Joey Wilson	SD	4	28 June 2007	The Trusts Arena, Auckland, New Zealand	
35	Lose	13–21–1	(New Zealand) Colin Wilson	UD	6	9 March 2007	Sleeman Sports Complex – Arena, Chandler, Queensland, Australia	
34	Win	13–20–1	(Samoa) Amosa Zinck	UD	6	11 November 2006	Vodafone Events Centre, Manukau City, New Zealand	
33	Lose	12–20–1	(New Zealand) Daniel Tai	TKO	2 (12) 0:53	5 June 2006	Manurewa Netball Centre, Manurewa, New Zealand	vacant New Zealand National Boxing Federation (NZNBF) heavyweight title
32	Lose	12–19–1	(Australia) Costa Chondros	TKO	2 (6) 2:09	17 February 2006	Town Hall, Moorabbin, Victoria, Australia	
31	Lose	12–18–1	(New Zealand) Elisara Sii Uta	PTS	8	19 November 2005	O'Hagen Bar & Restaurant, Pakuranga, New Zealand	
30	Lose	12–17–1	(Samoa) Amosa Zinck	PTS	6	30 June 2005	ASB Stadium, Kohimarama, New Zealand	
29	Lose	12–16–1	(New Zealand) Richard Tutaki	PTS	3	5 March 2005	ETA Stadium, Auckland, New Zealand	Semi-final heavyweight competition
28	Lose	12–15–1	(Uzbekistan) Yan Kulkov	KO	2 (6)	30 July 2004	Herb Graham Recreation Centre, Mirrabooka, Perth, Western Australia, Australia	
27	Lose	12–14–1	(New Zealand) Daniel Tai	PTS	6	24 June 2004	ASB Stadium, Kohimarama, New Zealand	
26	Lose	12–13–1	(Russia) Victor Oganov	TKO	2 (6)	13 June 2003	Panthers World of Entertainment, Penrith, New South Wales, Australia	
25	Lose	12–12–1	(Samoa) Lawrence Tauasa	TKO	3 (10)	28 March 2003	Panthers World of Entertainment, Penrith, New South Wales, Australia	
24	Lose	12–11–1	(Australia) Daniel Rowsell	TKO	3 (12)	9 January 2003	Jakarta, Indonesia	WBA – PABA cruiserweight title
23	Win	12–10–1	(Fiji) Pauliasi Ratu	TKO	3 (6)	9 December 2002	YMCA Stadium, Auckland, New Zealand	
22	Lose	11–10–1	(New Zealand) Sean Sullivan	UD	12	9 August 2002	Town Hall, Wellington, New Zealand	vacant New Zealand Boxing Association light heavyweight title
21	Lose	11–9–1	(Australia) Paul Murdoch	TKO	4 (12)	9 May 2002	Ocean City Restaurant, Auckland, New Zealand	WBA – PABA Light Heavyweight Title
20	Win	11–8–1	(Samoa) Viliamu Lesiva	PTS	6	9 March 2002	Pakuranga O'Hagens Bar, Auckland, New Zealand	
19	Lose	10–8–1	(Australia) Daniel Rowsell	TKO	3 (12)	7 December 2001	Wyong RSL Club, Wyong, New South Wales, Australia	WBA – PABA Cruiserweight Title
18	Lose	10–7–1	(Australia) Paul Briggs	KO	2 (10)	16 May 2001	Coogee-Randwick RSL Club, Sydney, New South Wales, Australia	
17	Lose	10–6–1	(New Zealand) Lightning Lupe	TKO	3 (12)	14 December 2000	ASB Stadium, Kohimarama, New Zealand	New Zealand National Boxing Federation (NZNBF) cruiserweight title
16	Win	10–5–1	(Samoa) Frank Faalenuu	PTS	12	12 October 2000	Rosa Pasifika Night Club, Otara, New Zealand	New Zealand National Boxing Federation (NZNBF) cruiserweight title
15	Win	9–5–1	(Samoa) Joseph Polu	TKO	3 (4)	19 August 2000	Powerstation Nightclub, Auckland, New Zealand	
14	Lose	8–5–1	(Samoa) Seiaute Ma'ilata	TKO	6 (10)	17 June 2000	Otara Recreational Centre, Manukau City, New Zealand	
13	Win	8–4–1	(Samoa) Joseph Polu	TKO	8 (10)	6 November 1999	Downtown Convention Centre, Auckland, New Zealand	
12	Win	7–4–1	(New Zealand) Joe Chanboon Tanuvasa	TKO	2 (4)	18 September 1999	Downtown Convention Centre, Auckland, New Zealand	
11	Lose	6–4–1	(United Kingdom) Clinton Woods	KO	6 (12)	10 July 1999	Elephant & Castle Centre, Southwark, London, United Kingdom	Commonwealth (British Empire) light heavyweight title
10	Win	6–3–1	(Fiji) Atama Raqili	KO	3 (12)	28 May 1999	Omnisports Stadium, Noumea, New Caledonia	vacant Oceanic Boxing Association super middleweight title
9	Lose	5–3–1	(South Korea) Yong-Suk Choi	TD	6 (10)	28 March 1999	Prefectural Gymnasium, Miyazaki, Miyazaki, Japan	
8	Win	5–2–1	(Samoa) Joseph Polu	TKO	4 (10)	6 February 1999	Downtown Convention Centre, Auckland, New Zealand	
7	Win	4–2–1	(Niue) Mike Makata	TKO	9 (12)	7 November 1998	Downtown Convention Centre, Auckland, New Zealand	New Zealand Boxing Association & vacant IBF Pan Pacific super middleweight title
6	Lose	3–2–1	(Australia) Glen Kelly	TKO	7 (12)	27 August 1998	South Sydney Junior Rugby League Club, Sydney, New South Wales, Australia	vacant IBF Pan Pacific light heavyweight title
5	Draw	3–1–1	(Niue) Mike Makata	PTS	10	25 April 1998	Downtown Convention Centre, Auckland, New Zealand	
4	Win	3–1	(Niue) Mike Makata	PTS	6	30 November 1997	Downtown Convention Centre, Auckland, New Zealand	
3	Win	2–1	(New Zealand) Lightning Lupe	KO	4 (6)	19 October 1997	Downtown Convention Centre, Auckland, New Zealand	
2	Win	1–1	(New Zealand) Simon Whiu	TKO	3 (6)	2 August 1997	Towers Nightclub, Rotorua, New Zealand	
1	Lose	0–1	(New Zealand) Simon Whiu	KO	1 (6)	30 March 1997	ABA Stadium, Auckland, New Zealand	Professional debut
