= Jameson Bostic =

American boxer

- Born: Jameson Bostic; 29 January 1984 (age 42); Brooklyn, New York, US
- Height: 195 cm (6 ft 5 in)
- Weight: 175 lb (79 kg; 12 st 7 lb)
- Division: Light Heavyweight
- Style: Boxing
- Stance: Southpaw
- Years active: 2003–2011

Professional boxing record
- Total: 28
- Wins: 23
- By knockout: 13
- Losses: 5
- By knockout: 2
- Draws: 0

Other information
- Children: Jaxan Joyce Bostic
- Boxing record from BoxRec
- Last updated on: 28 January 2017

Jameson Bostic (born 29 January 1984) is an American professional boxer who now resides in Auckland, New Zealand. Bostic is a former OPBF light heavyweight champion and was ranked in the WBC after defeating WBC 13th-ranked Japanese boxer Yuzo Kiyota.

In 2007, Bostic took on Don King as his manager, but the two split apart due to contractual issues and keeping Bostic inactive for over 13 months in 2008. After splitting from King, Bostic was brought over to New Zealand by Craig Thomson to restart his career. Bostic moved over to New Zealand in 2009.

== Professional boxing titles ==
- World Boxing Council
  - OPBF light heavyweight title (175 lbs)

== Professional boxing record ==
28 fights	23 wins	5 losses
By knockout	13	2
By decision	10	3
Draws	0	

No.	Result	Record	Opponent	Type	Round, time	Date	Location	Notes
28	Lose	23–5	(Malawi) Isaac Chilemba	KO	2 (8) 1:48	11 October 2010	(United States) Boardwalk Hall, Atlantic City, New Jersey, USA	
27	Win	23–4	(Japan) Yuzo Kiyota	TKO	1 (12) 2:08	11 October 2010	Korakuen Hall, Tokyo, Japan	vacant WBC – OPBF light heavyweight title
26	Win	22–4	(Samoa) Atalili Fai	RTD	2 (4) 3:00	21 August 2010	Panmure Lagoon Stadium, Panmure, New Zealand	
25	Win	21–4	(New Zealand) Vini Mahoni	MD	4	22 July 2010	ABA Stadium, Auckland, New Zealand	
24	Win	20–4	(New Zealand) Oscar Siale	UD	6	31 March 2010	The Trusts Arena, Auckland, New Zealand	
23	Win	19–4	(Samoa) Wilhem Schwalger	RTD	2 (6) 3:00	11 March 2010	ABA Stadium, Auckland, New Zealand	
22	Lose	18–4	(Poland) Mateusz Masternak	RTD	7 (10) 3:00	10 December 2009	MOSiR Hall, Radom, Poland	interim WBC Youth World cruiserweight title
21	Win	18–3	(New Zealand) Tapanuu Tagilimai	TKO	1 (4) 1:29	20 August 2009	ABA Stadium, Auckland, New Zealand	
20	Win	17–3	(Uzbekistan) Mirzohid Jianbaev	TKO	1 (6) 2:45	15 August 2009	Sport Complex “Daulet”, Astana, Kazakhstan	
19	Win	16–3	(Samoa) Junior Pati	UD	8	8 May 2009	ABA Stadium, Auckland, New Zealand	
18	Win	15–3	(New Zealand) Daniel Tai	UD	4	2 May 2009	Headhunters Motorcycle Club, Ellerslie, New Zealand	
17	Win	14–3	(Samoa) Moses Ioelu	UD	4	21 April 2009	Leisure Centre, Otara, New Zealand	
16	Win	13–3	(United States) Marvin Hunt	KO	2 (4) 1:25	21 March 2008	(United States) Omni New Daisy Theater, Memphis, Tennessee, USA	
15	Win	12–3	(United States) Marcus Upshaw	UD	6	6 October 2007	(United States) Madison Square Garden, New York, New York, USA	
14	Win	11–3	(United States) Craig Gandy	TKO	3 (6)	18 May 2007	(United States) Omni New Daisy Theater, Memphis, Tennessee, USA	
13	Win	10–3	(United States) Carlos Adams	KO	1 (4) 1:51	19 January 2007	(United States) Knox Arena, Olive Branch, Mississippi, USA	
12	Win	9–3	(Puerto Rico) Juan Carlos Lamberti	KO	4 (6) 1:45	23 September 2006	(United States) Mallory Square, Key West, Florida, USA	
11	Win	8–3	(United States) Toris Brewer	PTS	6	15 September 2006	(United States) Omar Shrine Temple, Mount Pleasant, South Carolina, USA	
10	Win	7–3	(Dominican Republic) Felix Cepeda	MD	6	28 July 2006	(United States) Seminole Hard Rock Hotel and Casino, Hollywood, Florida, USA	
9	Win	6–3	(United States) Dhafir Smith	MD	6	4 May 2006	(United States) Michael's Eighth Avenue, Glen Burnie, Maryland, USA	
8	Win	5–3	(United States) William Bailey	UD	6	9 March 2006	(United States) Michael's Eighth Avenue, Glen Burnie, Maryland, USA	
7	Win	4–3	(United States) Antonio Toribio	TKO	1 (6) 2:36	2 March 2006	(United States) Hammerstein Ballroom, New York, New York, USA	
6	Win	3–3	(United States) Davit Davitashvili	TKO	1 (4) 1:55	13 January 2006	(United States) National Guard Armory, Philadelphia, Pennsylvania, USA	
5	Lose	2–3	(United States) Max Alexander	UD	6	2 December 2005	(United States) Blue Horizon, Philadelphia, Pennsylvania, USA	
4	Win	2–2	(United States) Kevin Cruz	TKO	2 (6) 0:53	5 August 2005	(United States) Murray Skating Center, Yonkers, New York, USA	
3	Lose	1–2	(United States) Edwin Ranquillo	SD	4	6 May 2005	(United States) Westchester County Center, White Plains, New York, USA	
2	Lose	1–1	(Guyana) Shawn Corbin	UD	4	14 October 2004	(United States) Hilton Hotel, New York, New York, USA	
1	Win	1–0	(United States) Mike Estus	TKO	1 (4) 1:11	5 December 2003	(United States) Polk County Convention Center, Des Moines, Iowa, USA	
