= Willy Wise =

American boxer

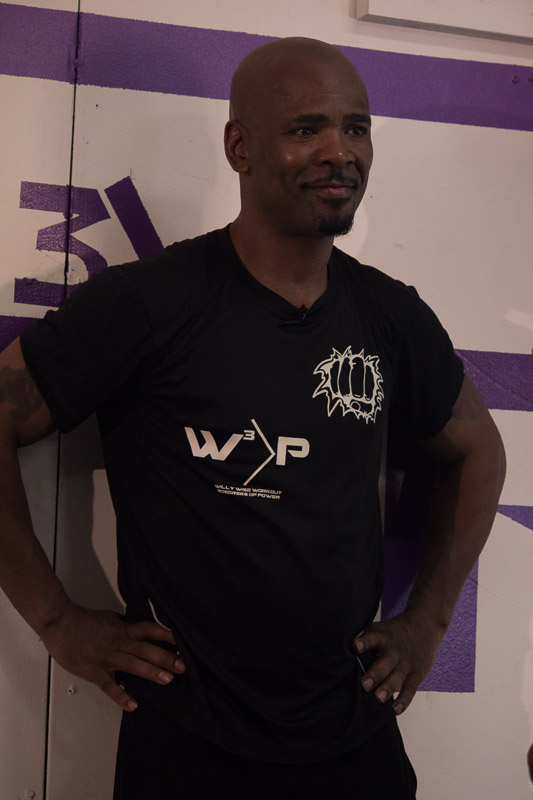
- Willy Wise
- Born: William Bernard Wise; January 29, 1967 (age 59); Eastern Shore, Virginia, U.S.
- Other names: Slick
- Nationality: (United States) American
- Height: 5 ft 9 1/2 in (1.77 m)
- Division: Welterweight
- Reach: 67 in (170 cm)
- Stance: Orthodox
- Fighting out of: Westbury, New York, U.S.
- Years active: 1988–2003

Professional boxing record
- Total: 41
- Wins: 26
- By knockout: 7
- Losses: 11
- By knockout: 7
- Draws: 4

Other information
- Spouse: Ava Gabrielle Wise (m. 2012), Eureka Mays (m. 1996-2011)
- Children: Shaquanna, Domonique, Mateo
- Notable relatives: Zelma Elder, Albert Eugene Thomas (parents)
- Website: wisechoiceboxing.com
- Boxing record from BoxRec

William Bernard "Willy" Wise (born January 29, 1967) is a retired American professional boxer from Onancock, Virginia. Wise has an IBO world title, but is best known for his 1999 upset of Julio Cesar Chavez. Wise was partially reared in Westbury, New York, from where he quickly rose to the top of the international amateur ranks and subsequently launched his professional career.

== Amateur career ==
Wise was an amateur standout, capturing various amateur titles, including:

1983 Virginia State Golden Gloves Champion Hampton Roads
1987 New York State Golden Gloves Champion
1987 Mayor's Cup in Washington, DC
1987 Empire State Champion New York

Wise ended his amateur career with an 87–10 record.

== Professional career ==
Shortly after entering the ranks of professional fighting, "Slick Willy" was given to him by his New York fans as a tribute to his ability to fight his way off of the ropes. One of the high points of his career was the October 1999 win over then number five ranked Julio César Chávez. It was "Upset of the Year" He later lost to him in a 2003 Tijuana re-match.

In the year 2000, he took the lightly regarded IBO championship belt, which was one of the final highlights of his boxing career, and also fought Shane Mosley with a loss in the third round. His boxing career ended in 2003 with a 26-11-4 professional record.

He won an IBO title in London.

== Post Retirement Endeavors ==
Today Wise trains and promotes other fighters at his training facility, allowing troubled youth and aspiring boxers to attend his residential training camp to teach them the lessons of boxing and discipline for life in and outside the ring. He also works closely with young people in the local community near his home, using his own resources to take them to boxing competitions around the country. He currently resides on the Eastern Shore of Virginia where he enjoys his favorite pastime of fishing for crabs off of the pier of his beachfront backyard and cooking them for sport.

== Injury in Car Accident ==
In October 2014, Wise was seriously injured in a single car accident when he crashed his Maserati on a road near his home in Harborton, Virginia. He was airlifted by helicopter to Sentara Norfolk General Hospital in Norfolk, VA with several broken vertebrae in his neck and back and traumatic brain injury. He was released from the hospital eight days later to begin physical therapy. A statement was released on social media stating that he hoped to return to the Wise Choice Boxing Fitness and Training Center in 2015.

== Release of DVD/Launch of Fitness Brand ==
In July 2015, Wise announced that he would be releasing his first boxing fitness DVD, entitled W3P: Willy Wise Workout: 3 Degrees of Power. The DVD release marked the launch of Wise's W3P Fitness brand, which includes apparel, water among other products.

Titles in pretence
Vacant Title last held by Peter Malinga	World Welterweight Champion; IBO recognition December 2, 2000 - June 11, 2001	Succeeded by Jawaid Khaliq
Awards
Previous: Ivan Robinson W10 Arturo Gatti I	The Ring Magazine Upset of the Year; W10 Julio César Chávez; 1999	Next: José Luis Castillo W12 Stevie Johnston
