= Jawaid Khaliq =

British boxer

Personal information
- Nickname: "Too Sleek"
- Nationality: British; Pakistani
- Born: 30 July 1970 (age 56) Meadows, Nottingham, England
- Height: 5 ft 10 1/2 in (179 cm)
- Weight: Welterweight; Light-middleweight

Boxing career
- Stance: Orthodox

Boxing record
- Total fights: 25
- Wins: 23
- Win by KO: 13
- Losses: 1
- Draws: 1

Jawaid Khaliq, MBE (born 30 July 1970), is a British former professional boxer who competed from 1997 to 2004. A dual Pakistan national, he became the first British Asian boxing world champion, winning the lightly-regarded IBO welterweight title in 2001 and defending it seven times before retiring three years later. He also held multiple regional championships, including the Commonwealth welterweight title in 2000.

== Personal life ==
Khaliq was born to Pakistani parents in Meadows, Nottingham on 30 July 1970. Khaliq took up boxing at the age of 16. Within a short span of time, he went on to win the Amateur Boxing Association of England championships and fought for England. Whilst boxing, Khaliq also worked as a taxi driver to support his family and initially went back to the trade after retirement, later using it to fund his Boxing Academy. He achieved an MBE for his service to his community.

== Professional career ==
Khaliq made his boxing debut at the age of 27 in 1997. Initially, he started taking fights on short notice, taking his second fight on a day's notice, and his third fight on two days' notice.

=== Light middleweight ===
As a light middleweight he held the WBF Inter-Continental Light Middleweight Title, winning the bout in way of 5th round TKO. He also held the BBBofC Midlands Area light-middleweight title, winning that bout in way of 6th round TKO.

=== Welterweight ===
As a welterweight, he held BBBofC Midlands Area welterweight title, winning the bout in way of 4th round TKO and Commonwealth welterweight title, before finally winning the International Boxing Organization welterweight title, and made seven defences before he chose to retire and vacate the title.

=== Promotional issues ===
Following the win over Willy Wise for the IBO World Welterweight Title, Khaliq started to want to pursue big fights in the U.S., coincidentally, world-class fighters such as Vernon Forrest started to call him out, but due to promotional issues Khaliq's ambitions failed to materialize.

== Retirement ==
Khaliq chose to retire partly due to complications, stating;

"...I had a couple of years waiting for fights, seeing people pull out, (and) fights not happening. I had a couple of fights cancelled. I was fed up, (after which) we started talking about come-back fights. I saw it as a backward step... I always wanted to test myself against the very best guys... I've lost the hunger."

== Life after boxing ==
After boxing, Khaliq started working full-time as a taxi driver to support his wife and children.

After requests from people asking him to train them, Khaliq set up 'Jawaid Khaliq Boxing Academy' in Nottingham which he funded by working as a taxi driver. The club claimed to prevent anti-social behaviour, and the police had acknowledged that the club has helped with the creation of healthy relationships with the local youth. However, in 2013, the club faced financial hurdles as it could not afford to stay on its current premises and faced the threat to close-down.

Khaliq has helped raise awareness about firefighting within the British Asian community, and has previously taken initiatives to help recruit more firefighters from within the community with the partnership of the service.

== Professional boxing record ==
25 fights	23 wins	1 loss
By knockout	13	0
By decision	10	1
Draws	1	

No.	Result	Record	Opponent	Type	Round, time	Date	Location	Notes
25	Win	23–1-1	(Colombia) Ener Julio	UD	12	14 Feb 2004	(United Kingdom) Harvey Hadden Leisure Centre, Nottingham, UK	Defended IBO world welterweight title
24	Win	22–1-1	(Russia) Maxim Nesterenko	UD	12	20 Sep 2003	(United Kingdom) Harvey Hadden Leisure Centre, Nottingham, UK	Defended IBO world welterweight title
23	Win	21–1-1	(South Africa) Jan Piet Bergman	TKO	7 (12)	1 Mar 2003	Carnival City Casino, Brakpan, South Africa	Defended IBO world welterweight title
22	Win	20–1-1	(Ukraine) Roman Dzhuman	SD	12	16 Nov 2002	(United Kingdom) Harvey Hadden Leisure Centre, Nottingham, UK	Defended IBO world welterweight title
21	Win	19–1-1	(Dominican Republic) Jose Joaquin Rosa Gomez	UD	12	27 Jul 2002	(United Kingdom) Harvey Hadden Leisure Centre, Nottingham, UK	Defended IBO world welterweight title
20	Win	18–1-1	(Russia) Maxim Nesterenko	TKO	12 (12), 0:45	23 Feb 2002	(United Kingdom) Harvey Hadden Leisure Centre, Nottingham, UK	Defended IBO world welterweight title
19	Win	17–1-1	(United States) Luther Smith	TKO	3 (8), 1:30	3 Nov 2001	(United Kingdom) Bellahouston Leisure Centre, Glasgow, UK	
18	Win	16–1-1	(Poland) Jacek Bielski	TKO	5 (12), 2:28	15 Sep 2001	(United Kingdom) Harvey Hadden Leisure Centre, Nottingham, UK	Defended IBO world welterweight title
17	Win	15–1-1	(United States) Willy Wise	UD	12	11 Jun 2001	(United Kingdom) Harvey Hadden Leisure Centre, Nottingham, UK	Won IBO world welterweight title
16	Win	14–1-1	(United Kingdom) Howard Clarke	PTS	6	26 Feb 2001	(United Kingdom) Harvey Hadden Leisure Centre, Nottingham, UK	
15	Win	13–1-1	(New Zealand) Sean Sullivan	PTS	12	27 Nov 2000	(United Kingdom) Aston Villa Leisure Centre, Birmingham, UK	Won vacant Commonwealth (British Empire) welterweight title
14	Win	12–1-1	(United Kingdom) Trevor Smith	TKO	1 (6)	28 Oct 2000	(United Kingdom) Coventry Skydome, Coventry, UK	
13	Win	11–1-1	(United Kingdom) Ernie Smith	TKO	4 (10)	13 Aug 2000	(United Kingdom) Victoria Baths, Nottingham, UK	Won vacant BBBofC Midlands Area welterweight title
12	Win	10–1-1	(United Kingdom) Dennis Berry	TKO	6 (10), 2:22	21 May 2000	(United Kingdom) Pennine Hotel, Derby, UK	Won vacant BBBofC Midlands Area super-welterweight title
11	Win	9–1-1	(United Kingdom) Jason Collins	PTS	6	27 Feb 2000	(United Kingdom) Leeds Town Hall, Leeds, UK	
10	Win	8–1-1	(United Kingdom) Lee Bird	TKO	4 (6)	15 Jan 2000	(United Kingdom) Doncaster Dome, Doncaster, UK	
9	Win	7–1-1	(Germany) Dirk Kaltenbach	KO	2 (8)	14 Dec 1999	Telde, Islas Canarias, Spain	
8	Win	6–1-1	(United Kingdom) Lee Murtagh	TKO	5 (12), 0:35	27 Sep 1999	(United Kingdom) Royal Armouries Museum, Leeds, UK	Won vacant WBF Inter-Continental light-middleweight title
7	Loss	5–1-1	(France) Frederic Klose	PTS	8	3 Dec 1998	Epernay, Marne, France	
6	Win	5–0-1	(United Kingdom) Harry Butler	PTS	4	5 Sep 1998	(United Kingdom) Ice Rink, Telford, UK	
5	Win	4–0-1	(United Kingdom) Koba Kulu	PTS	4	7 Mar 1998	(United Kingdom) Rivermead Leisure Centre, Reading, UK	
4	Win	3–0-1	(Iran) Takaloo	TKO	4 (4), 2:47	7 Feb 1998	(United Kingdom) Grundy Park Leisure Centre, Cheshunt, UK	
3	Draw	2–0-1	(United Kingdom) Mark Ramsey	PTS	4	13 Dec 1997	(United Kingdom) Ponds Forge Arena, Sheffield, UK	
2	Win	2–0	(United Kingdom) Martin Holgate	TKO	6 (6), 2:39	13 Sep 1997	(United Kingdom) London Arena, Millwall, UK	
1	Win	1–0	(United Kingdom) Richard Inquieti	TKO	5 (6), 1:15	18 Aug 1997	(United Kingdom) Welcome Inn, Nottingham, UK	Professional debut

== See also ==
British Pakistanis

Titles in pretence
Preceded by Willy Wise	IBO welterweight champion 11 June 2001 – 14 February 2004; Retired	Vacant Title next held by Floyd Mayweather Jr.
