= Julian Holland (boxer) =

Australian boxer (born 1972)

Personal information
- Nickname: Fighting Farrier
- Nationality: Australian
- Born: 13 October 1972 (age 54) Bendigo
- Weight: welter/light middleweight

Boxing career
- Stance: Orthodox

Boxing record
- Total fights: 33
- Wins: 29 (KO 19)
- Losses: 3 (KO 1)
- Draws: 1

Julian "Fighting Farrier" Holland (born 13 October 1972 in Bendigo) is an Australian professional welter/light middleweight boxer of the 1990s and 2000s who won the Queensland (Australia) State welterweight title, Pan Pacific welterweight title, Australian welterweight title, Oceanic Boxing Association welterweight title, Australasian welterweight title, Pan Pacific light middleweight title, World Boxing Organization (WBO) Asia Pacific welterweight title, and Commonwealth light welterweight title, his professional fighting weight varied from 143 lb (65 kg; 10 st 3 lb), i.e. welterweight to 154 lb (70 kg; 11 st 0 lb), i.e. light middleweight.
