= Due Drop Events Centre =

Multi-purpose event centre located in Manukau, Auckland, New Zealand

Coordinates: 36.9988511°S 174.8873663°E

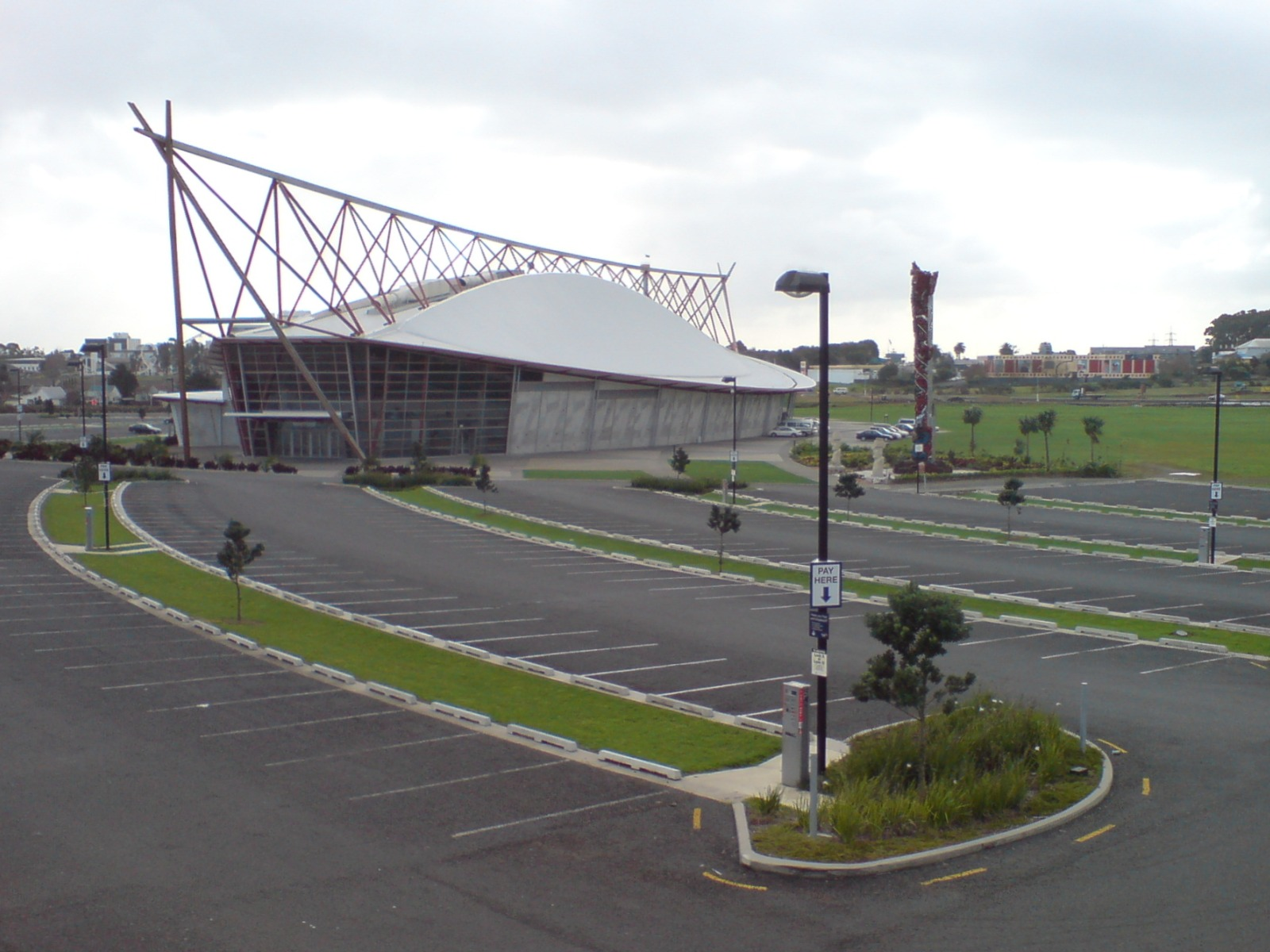
- Interactive map of Due Drop Events Centre
- Former names: Vodafone Events Centre (2013-22); TelstraClear Pacific Events Centre (2005-13)
- Address: 770 Great South Road
- Location: Manukau, Auckland, New Zealand
- Owner: Waka Pacific Trust
- Operator: Waka Pacific Trust

Construction
- Opened: 3 April 2005; 21 years ago
- Cost: NZ$ 48.7 million

Website
- https://www.duedropeventscentre.org.nz/

Due Drop Events Centre (previously known as the Vodafone Events Centre and TelstraClear Pacific Events Centre) is a multi-purpose event centre located in Manukau, Auckland, New Zealand (suburb of the former Manukau City), with an indoor arena, theatre and meeting halls hosting community, cultural and sports events, concerts and plays, exhibits, trade fairs and expos, corporate functions, meetings, weddings and other special events. Construction of the centre cost an estimated NZ$48.7 million, of which somewhat less than half came from the former Manukau City Council. The naming rights sponsor was Vodafone New Zealand (now One NZ), but after it was purchased by the Due Drop Foundation, the centre was subsequently renamed.

== Facilities ==
Sir Woolf Fisher Arena

The Sir Woolf Fisher Arena has an end theatre stage capacity of 3,000 people utilising a combination of terraced and flat floor seating.

BNZ Theatre

Sponsored by BNZ, this theatre features changeable seating with a traditional end stage format. The theatre sits a maximum of 700 people. It is home to the Manukau Symphony Orchestra while hosting other concerts, plays, musicals, recitals, weddings and conferences. The theatre includes four dressing rooms.

Trillian Wero Whitewater Park

The Trillian Wero Whitewater Park (opened 2016, formerly Wero Whitewater Park until 2025) is the first purpose-built man-made river and white-water facility of New Zealand, offers water activities including rafting, kayaking and standup paddleboarding as well as for the 2017 World Masters Games.

Wero Climb

The Wero Climb (opened 2025) is a 16-meter-high climbing structure featuring over 70 unique challenges, and stories inspired by Māori mythology. It's safe, fun, and designed for adventurers of all ages and fitness levels.

== 2009 highlights ==
Mayoress Charity Gala Ball raised $300,000 for Kidz First
NZ$ 544,000 given in direct community sponsorship
9,020 students attended our Schools Programme
Home to the Manukau Symphony Orchestra
Home to The Original Art Sale, Auckland's largest art market
Host to the Southside Arts Festival
Over 1.3 million visitors since opening
65% of events were community-based
Design completed for Stage 2

== Awards ==
The Due Drop Events Centre has won a number of awards over the years:

- NZIA Resene, Local Award for Architecture - Category: Community & Cultural (2005)
- Origin Timber Design Awards - Category: Commercial or Public / Architectural Excellence (Cox Creative Spaces, Sinclair Knight Merz & Mainzeal Construction) / Supreme Award Winner (2005)
- Property Council of New Zealand / Rider Hunt Property Awards - Category: Special Purpose Property Award of Excellence (Ignite Architects), (2006)
- AGENZ, Silver Award of Merit - Category: In recognition of an outstanding project (2006)
- Westpac Manukau Business Excellence Award - Category: Excellence in Tourism - Finalist (2006)
- Westpac Manukau Business Excellence Award - Category: Excellence in Tourism - Winner (2006)
